

454001–454100 

|-bgcolor=#d6d6d6
| 454001 ||  || — || October 12, 2010 || Mount Lemmon || Mount Lemmon Survey || — || align=right | 1.8 km || 
|-id=002 bgcolor=#d6d6d6
| 454002 ||  || — || September 26, 2009 || Mount Lemmon || Mount Lemmon Survey || — || align=right | 2.7 km || 
|-id=003 bgcolor=#E9E9E9
| 454003 ||  || — || March 16, 2008 || Kitt Peak || Spacewatch || MAR || align=right | 1.3 km || 
|-id=004 bgcolor=#E9E9E9
| 454004 ||  || — || April 11, 2008 || Mount Lemmon || Mount Lemmon Survey || — || align=right | 1.2 km || 
|-id=005 bgcolor=#E9E9E9
| 454005 ||  || — || September 25, 2005 || Kitt Peak || Spacewatch || — || align=right | 2.5 km || 
|-id=006 bgcolor=#d6d6d6
| 454006 ||  || — || October 21, 2009 || Mount Lemmon || Mount Lemmon Survey || — || align=right | 2.8 km || 
|-id=007 bgcolor=#d6d6d6
| 454007 ||  || — || February 8, 2007 || Kitt Peak || Spacewatch || — || align=right | 2.2 km || 
|-id=008 bgcolor=#E9E9E9
| 454008 ||  || — || January 19, 2012 || Kitt Peak || Spacewatch || — || align=right | 1.5 km || 
|-id=009 bgcolor=#E9E9E9
| 454009 ||  || — || September 14, 2006 || Kitt Peak || Spacewatch || — || align=right | 1.2 km || 
|-id=010 bgcolor=#E9E9E9
| 454010 ||  || — || February 8, 2007 || Mount Lemmon || Mount Lemmon Survey || — || align=right | 1.8 km || 
|-id=011 bgcolor=#E9E9E9
| 454011 ||  || — || November 23, 2006 || Kitt Peak || Spacewatch || — || align=right data-sort-value="0.86" | 860 m || 
|-id=012 bgcolor=#E9E9E9
| 454012 ||  || — || December 21, 2006 || Mount Lemmon || Mount Lemmon Survey || AGN || align=right data-sort-value="0.99" | 990 m || 
|-id=013 bgcolor=#E9E9E9
| 454013 ||  || — || November 13, 2010 || Mount Lemmon || Mount Lemmon Survey || — || align=right | 1.7 km || 
|-id=014 bgcolor=#d6d6d6
| 454014 ||  || — || September 20, 2009 || Mount Lemmon || Mount Lemmon Survey || — || align=right | 3.1 km || 
|-id=015 bgcolor=#d6d6d6
| 454015 ||  || — || September 28, 2009 || Kitt Peak || Spacewatch || — || align=right | 3.2 km || 
|-id=016 bgcolor=#d6d6d6
| 454016 ||  || — || February 25, 2012 || Kitt Peak || Spacewatch || — || align=right | 2.4 km || 
|-id=017 bgcolor=#E9E9E9
| 454017 ||  || — || September 18, 2010 || Mount Lemmon || Mount Lemmon Survey || — || align=right | 2.4 km || 
|-id=018 bgcolor=#d6d6d6
| 454018 ||  || — || January 29, 2012 || Kitt Peak || Spacewatch || — || align=right | 2.8 km || 
|-id=019 bgcolor=#d6d6d6
| 454019 ||  || — || August 15, 2009 || Kitt Peak || Spacewatch || EOS || align=right | 1.6 km || 
|-id=020 bgcolor=#E9E9E9
| 454020 ||  || — || September 16, 2010 || Kitt Peak || Spacewatch || GEF || align=right | 1.0 km || 
|-id=021 bgcolor=#E9E9E9
| 454021 ||  || — || March 30, 2008 || Kitt Peak || Spacewatch || — || align=right | 1.1 km || 
|-id=022 bgcolor=#E9E9E9
| 454022 ||  || — || June 20, 2010 || Mount Lemmon || Mount Lemmon Survey || — || align=right | 2.1 km || 
|-id=023 bgcolor=#E9E9E9
| 454023 ||  || — || December 21, 2006 || Kitt Peak || Spacewatch || — || align=right | 2.0 km || 
|-id=024 bgcolor=#E9E9E9
| 454024 ||  || — || March 13, 2008 || Catalina || CSS || — || align=right | 3.4 km || 
|-id=025 bgcolor=#d6d6d6
| 454025 ||  || — || January 29, 2012 || Kitt Peak || Spacewatch || BRA || align=right | 1.2 km || 
|-id=026 bgcolor=#d6d6d6
| 454026 ||  || — || November 30, 2005 || Mount Lemmon || Mount Lemmon Survey || — || align=right | 2.9 km || 
|-id=027 bgcolor=#d6d6d6
| 454027 ||  || — || November 9, 1999 || Kitt Peak || Spacewatch || — || align=right | 3.2 km || 
|-id=028 bgcolor=#E9E9E9
| 454028 ||  || — || October 12, 2006 || Kitt Peak || Spacewatch || — || align=right | 1.5 km || 
|-id=029 bgcolor=#d6d6d6
| 454029 ||  || — || January 23, 2006 || Kitt Peak || Spacewatch || — || align=right | 3.0 km || 
|-id=030 bgcolor=#d6d6d6
| 454030 ||  || — || February 6, 2002 || Socorro || LINEAR || — || align=right | 2.7 km || 
|-id=031 bgcolor=#d6d6d6
| 454031 ||  || — || March 17, 2012 || Mount Lemmon || Mount Lemmon Survey || — || align=right | 2.5 km || 
|-id=032 bgcolor=#d6d6d6
| 454032 ||  || — || March 16, 2012 || Kitt Peak || Spacewatch || EOS || align=right | 1.5 km || 
|-id=033 bgcolor=#d6d6d6
| 454033 ||  || — || August 18, 2009 || Kitt Peak || Spacewatch || — || align=right | 2.9 km || 
|-id=034 bgcolor=#d6d6d6
| 454034 ||  || — || March 31, 2001 || Kitt Peak || Spacewatch || — || align=right | 3.1 km || 
|-id=035 bgcolor=#d6d6d6
| 454035 ||  || — || March 2, 2012 || Mount Lemmon || Mount Lemmon Survey || — || align=right | 2.9 km || 
|-id=036 bgcolor=#d6d6d6
| 454036 ||  || — || January 9, 2006 || Kitt Peak || Spacewatch || — || align=right | 2.5 km || 
|-id=037 bgcolor=#E9E9E9
| 454037 ||  || — || February 29, 2012 || Kitt Peak || Spacewatch || — || align=right | 2.1 km || 
|-id=038 bgcolor=#d6d6d6
| 454038 ||  || — || September 17, 2009 || Kitt Peak || Spacewatch || VER || align=right | 2.5 km || 
|-id=039 bgcolor=#d6d6d6
| 454039 ||  || — || February 4, 2006 || Kitt Peak || Spacewatch || THM || align=right | 2.1 km || 
|-id=040 bgcolor=#d6d6d6
| 454040 ||  || — || October 1, 2009 || Mount Lemmon || Mount Lemmon Survey || — || align=right | 2.5 km || 
|-id=041 bgcolor=#d6d6d6
| 454041 ||  || — || December 4, 2005 || Kitt Peak || Spacewatch || — || align=right | 2.2 km || 
|-id=042 bgcolor=#E9E9E9
| 454042 ||  || — || February 20, 2012 || Catalina || CSS || — || align=right | 3.1 km || 
|-id=043 bgcolor=#E9E9E9
| 454043 ||  || — || March 14, 2012 || Catalina || CSS || — || align=right | 1.6 km || 
|-id=044 bgcolor=#E9E9E9
| 454044 ||  || — || February 26, 2012 || Mount Lemmon || Mount Lemmon Survey || — || align=right | 1.4 km || 
|-id=045 bgcolor=#E9E9E9
| 454045 ||  || — || May 14, 2008 || Mount Lemmon || Mount Lemmon Survey || — || align=right | 1.4 km || 
|-id=046 bgcolor=#E9E9E9
| 454046 ||  || — || October 27, 2005 || Kitt Peak || Spacewatch || — || align=right | 2.4 km || 
|-id=047 bgcolor=#d6d6d6
| 454047 ||  || — || March 28, 2012 || Kitt Peak || Spacewatch || — || align=right | 3.0 km || 
|-id=048 bgcolor=#d6d6d6
| 454048 ||  || — || June 10, 2007 || Kitt Peak || Spacewatch || — || align=right | 3.1 km || 
|-id=049 bgcolor=#d6d6d6
| 454049 ||  || — || December 19, 2004 || Mount Lemmon || Mount Lemmon Survey || — || align=right | 3.4 km || 
|-id=050 bgcolor=#d6d6d6
| 454050 ||  || — || February 6, 2006 || Kitt Peak || Spacewatch || — || align=right | 2.6 km || 
|-id=051 bgcolor=#d6d6d6
| 454051 ||  || — || January 28, 2011 || Mount Lemmon || Mount Lemmon Survey || — || align=right | 3.2 km || 
|-id=052 bgcolor=#d6d6d6
| 454052 ||  || — || February 20, 2006 || Socorro || LINEAR || — || align=right | 3.4 km || 
|-id=053 bgcolor=#d6d6d6
| 454053 ||  || — || October 22, 2009 || Mount Lemmon || Mount Lemmon Survey || — || align=right | 3.1 km || 
|-id=054 bgcolor=#d6d6d6
| 454054 ||  || — || March 28, 2012 || Kitt Peak || Spacewatch || — || align=right | 2.6 km || 
|-id=055 bgcolor=#d6d6d6
| 454055 ||  || — || September 9, 2008 || Mount Lemmon || Mount Lemmon Survey || — || align=right | 3.1 km || 
|-id=056 bgcolor=#d6d6d6
| 454056 ||  || — || February 24, 2006 || Catalina || CSS || — || align=right | 3.6 km || 
|-id=057 bgcolor=#d6d6d6
| 454057 ||  || — || March 3, 2006 || Catalina || CSS || Tj (2.99) || align=right | 6.5 km || 
|-id=058 bgcolor=#d6d6d6
| 454058 ||  || — || October 22, 2009 || Mount Lemmon || Mount Lemmon Survey || — || align=right | 2.7 km || 
|-id=059 bgcolor=#d6d6d6
| 454059 ||  || — || February 24, 2006 || Kitt Peak || Spacewatch || — || align=right | 2.6 km || 
|-id=060 bgcolor=#d6d6d6
| 454060 ||  || — || April 29, 2006 || Siding Spring || SSS || Tj (2.97) || align=right | 3.4 km || 
|-id=061 bgcolor=#d6d6d6
| 454061 ||  || — || April 21, 2012 || Mount Lemmon || Mount Lemmon Survey || — || align=right | 2.8 km || 
|-id=062 bgcolor=#d6d6d6
| 454062 ||  || — || April 7, 2006 || Kitt Peak || Spacewatch || — || align=right | 2.7 km || 
|-id=063 bgcolor=#d6d6d6
| 454063 ||  || — || November 20, 2009 || Kitt Peak || Spacewatch || — || align=right | 2.8 km || 
|-id=064 bgcolor=#E9E9E9
| 454064 ||  || — || October 1, 2005 || Mount Lemmon || Mount Lemmon Survey || — || align=right | 1.8 km || 
|-id=065 bgcolor=#d6d6d6
| 454065 ||  || — || April 20, 2012 || Mount Lemmon || Mount Lemmon Survey || — || align=right | 3.1 km || 
|-id=066 bgcolor=#d6d6d6
| 454066 ||  || — || March 15, 2012 || Kitt Peak || Spacewatch || — || align=right | 3.8 km || 
|-id=067 bgcolor=#d6d6d6
| 454067 ||  || — || November 20, 2009 || Mount Lemmon || Mount Lemmon Survey || EMA || align=right | 3.0 km || 
|-id=068 bgcolor=#fefefe
| 454068 ||  || — || April 19, 2004 || Socorro || LINEAR || H || align=right data-sort-value="0.75" | 750 m || 
|-id=069 bgcolor=#fefefe
| 454069 ||  || — || December 23, 2000 || Kitt Peak || Spacewatch || H || align=right data-sort-value="0.63" | 630 m || 
|-id=070 bgcolor=#d6d6d6
| 454070 ||  || — || March 22, 2001 || Cima Ekar || ADAS || 3:2 || align=right | 4.5 km || 
|-id=071 bgcolor=#fefefe
| 454071 ||  || — || March 3, 2005 || Kitt Peak || Spacewatch || — || align=right data-sort-value="0.55" | 550 m || 
|-id=072 bgcolor=#fefefe
| 454072 ||  || — || April 28, 1998 || Kitt Peak || Spacewatch || H || align=right data-sort-value="0.75" | 750 m || 
|-id=073 bgcolor=#C2FFFF
| 454073 ||  || — || March 12, 2007 || Kitt Peak || Spacewatch || L5 || align=right | 8.3 km || 
|-id=074 bgcolor=#fefefe
| 454074 ||  || — || October 16, 2004 || Socorro || LINEAR || H || align=right data-sort-value="0.84" | 840 m || 
|-id=075 bgcolor=#FA8072
| 454075 ||  || — || October 24, 2009 || Kitt Peak || Spacewatch || — || align=right data-sort-value="0.60" | 600 m || 
|-id=076 bgcolor=#fefefe
| 454076 ||  || — || March 13, 2011 || Siding Spring || SSS || H || align=right data-sort-value="0.94" | 940 m || 
|-id=077 bgcolor=#fefefe
| 454077 ||  || — || November 10, 2004 || Catalina || CSS || H || align=right data-sort-value="0.72" | 720 m || 
|-id=078 bgcolor=#FFC2E0
| 454078 ||  || — || November 13, 2012 || Mount Lemmon || Mount Lemmon Survey || AMO +1km || align=right | 3.0 km || 
|-id=079 bgcolor=#fefefe
| 454079 ||  || — || March 13, 2007 || Mount Lemmon || Mount Lemmon Survey || — || align=right data-sort-value="0.79" | 790 m || 
|-id=080 bgcolor=#fefefe
| 454080 ||  || — || November 26, 2012 || Mount Lemmon || Mount Lemmon Survey || — || align=right data-sort-value="0.94" | 940 m || 
|-id=081 bgcolor=#fefefe
| 454081 ||  || — || December 22, 2008 || Mount Lemmon || Mount Lemmon Survey || CLA || align=right | 2.2 km || 
|-id=082 bgcolor=#fefefe
| 454082 ||  || — || September 22, 2008 || Mount Lemmon || Mount Lemmon Survey || — || align=right data-sort-value="0.79" | 790 m || 
|-id=083 bgcolor=#fefefe
| 454083 ||  || — || September 5, 2008 || Kitt Peak || Spacewatch || — || align=right data-sort-value="0.62" | 620 m || 
|-id=084 bgcolor=#fefefe
| 454084 ||  || — || March 14, 2007 || Mount Lemmon || Mount Lemmon Survey || — || align=right data-sort-value="0.74" | 740 m || 
|-id=085 bgcolor=#fefefe
| 454085 ||  || — || October 25, 2005 || Catalina || CSS || — || align=right | 1.0 km || 
|-id=086 bgcolor=#fefefe
| 454086 ||  || — || November 22, 2008 || Kitt Peak || Spacewatch || — || align=right | 1.0 km || 
|-id=087 bgcolor=#fefefe
| 454087 ||  || — || January 12, 2010 || Kitt Peak || Spacewatch || — || align=right data-sort-value="0.68" | 680 m || 
|-id=088 bgcolor=#E9E9E9
| 454088 ||  || — || December 9, 2012 || Kitt Peak || Spacewatch || EUN || align=right | 1.1 km || 
|-id=089 bgcolor=#fefefe
| 454089 ||  || — || September 10, 2004 || Kitt Peak || Spacewatch || — || align=right data-sort-value="0.58" | 580 m || 
|-id=090 bgcolor=#fefefe
| 454090 ||  || — || September 7, 2008 || Mount Lemmon || Mount Lemmon Survey || — || align=right data-sort-value="0.63" | 630 m || 
|-id=091 bgcolor=#fefefe
| 454091 ||  || — || December 5, 2008 || Kitt Peak || Spacewatch || — || align=right data-sort-value="0.65" | 650 m || 
|-id=092 bgcolor=#fefefe
| 454092 ||  || — || June 9, 2007 || Kitt Peak || Spacewatch || — || align=right data-sort-value="0.66" | 660 m || 
|-id=093 bgcolor=#E9E9E9
| 454093 ||  || — || October 12, 2007 || Mount Lemmon || Mount Lemmon Survey || — || align=right | 2.8 km || 
|-id=094 bgcolor=#FFC2E0
| 454094 ||  || — || January 19, 2013 || Mount Lemmon || Mount Lemmon Survey || APOPHA || align=right data-sort-value="0.17" | 170 m || 
|-id=095 bgcolor=#fefefe
| 454095 ||  || — || September 2, 2008 || Kitt Peak || Spacewatch || (2076) || align=right data-sort-value="0.64" | 640 m || 
|-id=096 bgcolor=#fefefe
| 454096 ||  || — || October 10, 2008 || Mount Lemmon || Mount Lemmon Survey || — || align=right data-sort-value="0.86" | 860 m || 
|-id=097 bgcolor=#fefefe
| 454097 ||  || — || November 22, 2005 || Kitt Peak || Spacewatch || — || align=right data-sort-value="0.62" | 620 m || 
|-id=098 bgcolor=#fefefe
| 454098 ||  || — || January 10, 2013 || Kitt Peak || Spacewatch || — || align=right data-sort-value="0.90" | 900 m || 
|-id=099 bgcolor=#fefefe
| 454099 ||  || — || February 1, 2006 || Kitt Peak || Spacewatch || — || align=right data-sort-value="0.93" | 930 m || 
|-id=100 bgcolor=#FFC2E0
| 454100 ||  || — || January 22, 2013 || Mount Lemmon || Mount Lemmon Survey || APOPHA || align=right data-sort-value="0.55" | 550 m || 
|}

454101–454200 

|-bgcolor=#FFC2E0
| 454101 ||  || — || January 22, 2013 || Mount Lemmon || Mount Lemmon Survey || APOPHA || align=right data-sort-value="0.31" | 310 m || 
|-id=102 bgcolor=#fefefe
| 454102 ||  || — || November 9, 2008 || Mount Lemmon || Mount Lemmon Survey || — || align=right data-sort-value="0.82" | 820 m || 
|-id=103 bgcolor=#fefefe
| 454103 ||  || — || March 23, 2003 || Kitt Peak || Spacewatch || (2076) || align=right data-sort-value="0.71" | 710 m || 
|-id=104 bgcolor=#fefefe
| 454104 ||  || — || December 30, 2005 || Kitt Peak || Spacewatch || — || align=right data-sort-value="0.85" | 850 m || 
|-id=105 bgcolor=#fefefe
| 454105 ||  || — || June 28, 2011 || Mount Lemmon || Mount Lemmon Survey || — || align=right | 1.2 km || 
|-id=106 bgcolor=#fefefe
| 454106 ||  || — || October 1, 2008 || Catalina || CSS || — || align=right data-sort-value="0.92" | 920 m || 
|-id=107 bgcolor=#fefefe
| 454107 ||  || — || September 4, 2008 || Kitt Peak || Spacewatch || — || align=right data-sort-value="0.72" | 720 m || 
|-id=108 bgcolor=#fefefe
| 454108 ||  || — || December 4, 2005 || Mount Lemmon || Mount Lemmon Survey || — || align=right data-sort-value="0.65" | 650 m || 
|-id=109 bgcolor=#fefefe
| 454109 ||  || — || December 7, 2005 || Kitt Peak || Spacewatch || — || align=right data-sort-value="0.79" | 790 m || 
|-id=110 bgcolor=#E9E9E9
| 454110 ||  || — || December 3, 2007 || Kitt Peak || Spacewatch || — || align=right | 2.5 km || 
|-id=111 bgcolor=#fefefe
| 454111 ||  || — || September 24, 2008 || Kitt Peak || Spacewatch || (1338) || align=right data-sort-value="0.61" | 610 m || 
|-id=112 bgcolor=#fefefe
| 454112 ||  || — || December 2, 2005 || Mount Lemmon || Mount Lemmon Survey || — || align=right data-sort-value="0.80" | 800 m || 
|-id=113 bgcolor=#fefefe
| 454113 ||  || — || February 7, 2013 || Kitt Peak || Spacewatch || — || align=right data-sort-value="0.74" | 740 m || 
|-id=114 bgcolor=#fefefe
| 454114 ||  || — || October 28, 2005 || Mount Lemmon || Mount Lemmon Survey || — || align=right data-sort-value="0.63" | 630 m || 
|-id=115 bgcolor=#fefefe
| 454115 ||  || — || November 1, 2008 || Mount Lemmon || Mount Lemmon Survey || — || align=right data-sort-value="0.63" | 630 m || 
|-id=116 bgcolor=#fefefe
| 454116 ||  || — || February 5, 2013 || Kitt Peak || Spacewatch || NYS || align=right data-sort-value="0.56" | 560 m || 
|-id=117 bgcolor=#fefefe
| 454117 ||  || — || January 19, 2002 || Kitt Peak || Spacewatch || NYS || align=right data-sort-value="0.58" | 580 m || 
|-id=118 bgcolor=#fefefe
| 454118 ||  || — || February 6, 2013 || Kitt Peak || Spacewatch || V || align=right data-sort-value="0.71" | 710 m || 
|-id=119 bgcolor=#fefefe
| 454119 ||  || — || September 21, 2008 || Kitt Peak || Spacewatch || — || align=right data-sort-value="0.67" | 670 m || 
|-id=120 bgcolor=#E9E9E9
| 454120 ||  || — || February 12, 2008 || Mount Lemmon || Mount Lemmon Survey || — || align=right | 2.7 km || 
|-id=121 bgcolor=#fefefe
| 454121 ||  || — || December 18, 2001 || Socorro || LINEAR || — || align=right data-sort-value="0.76" | 760 m || 
|-id=122 bgcolor=#fefefe
| 454122 ||  || — || October 26, 2008 || Kitt Peak || Spacewatch || — || align=right data-sort-value="0.66" | 660 m || 
|-id=123 bgcolor=#E9E9E9
| 454123 ||  || — || February 5, 2013 || Kitt Peak || Spacewatch || — || align=right | 2.2 km || 
|-id=124 bgcolor=#fefefe
| 454124 ||  || — || December 21, 2008 || Mount Lemmon || Mount Lemmon Survey || — || align=right data-sort-value="0.77" | 770 m || 
|-id=125 bgcolor=#fefefe
| 454125 ||  || — || January 28, 2006 || Kitt Peak || Spacewatch || — || align=right data-sort-value="0.49" | 490 m || 
|-id=126 bgcolor=#fefefe
| 454126 ||  || — || September 23, 2000 || Anderson Mesa || LONEOS || — || align=right | 1.0 km || 
|-id=127 bgcolor=#fefefe
| 454127 ||  || — || April 24, 2006 || Kitt Peak || Spacewatch || — || align=right data-sort-value="0.61" | 610 m || 
|-id=128 bgcolor=#fefefe
| 454128 ||  || — || February 2, 2009 || Mount Lemmon || Mount Lemmon Survey || — || align=right data-sort-value="0.68" | 680 m || 
|-id=129 bgcolor=#fefefe
| 454129 ||  || — || January 19, 2013 || Mount Lemmon || Mount Lemmon Survey || — || align=right data-sort-value="0.75" | 750 m || 
|-id=130 bgcolor=#fefefe
| 454130 ||  || — || January 16, 2009 || Mount Lemmon || Mount Lemmon Survey || — || align=right data-sort-value="0.63" | 630 m || 
|-id=131 bgcolor=#fefefe
| 454131 ||  || — || April 20, 2006 || Mount Lemmon || Mount Lemmon Survey || NYS || align=right data-sort-value="0.66" | 660 m || 
|-id=132 bgcolor=#fefefe
| 454132 ||  || — || March 8, 2000 || Kitt Peak || Spacewatch || — || align=right data-sort-value="0.54" | 540 m || 
|-id=133 bgcolor=#fefefe
| 454133 ||  || — || November 6, 2008 || Mount Lemmon || Mount Lemmon Survey || — || align=right data-sort-value="0.55" | 550 m || 
|-id=134 bgcolor=#fefefe
| 454134 ||  || — || January 19, 2013 || Kitt Peak || Spacewatch || — || align=right data-sort-value="0.72" | 720 m || 
|-id=135 bgcolor=#fefefe
| 454135 ||  || — || April 18, 2006 || Kitt Peak || Spacewatch || MAS || align=right data-sort-value="0.71" | 710 m || 
|-id=136 bgcolor=#fefefe
| 454136 ||  || — || February 2, 2006 || Kitt Peak || Spacewatch || — || align=right data-sort-value="0.51" | 510 m || 
|-id=137 bgcolor=#fefefe
| 454137 ||  || — || February 19, 2010 || Mount Lemmon || Mount Lemmon Survey || — || align=right data-sort-value="0.48" | 480 m || 
|-id=138 bgcolor=#fefefe
| 454138 ||  || — || March 13, 2002 || Kitt Peak || Spacewatch || — || align=right data-sort-value="0.66" | 660 m || 
|-id=139 bgcolor=#fefefe
| 454139 ||  || — || September 12, 2007 || Mount Lemmon || Mount Lemmon Survey || NYS || align=right data-sort-value="0.68" | 680 m || 
|-id=140 bgcolor=#E9E9E9
| 454140 ||  || — || April 22, 2010 || WISE || WISE ||  || align=right | 2.5 km || 
|-id=141 bgcolor=#E9E9E9
| 454141 ||  || — || September 21, 2011 || Kitt Peak || Spacewatch || — || align=right | 1.4 km || 
|-id=142 bgcolor=#fefefe
| 454142 ||  || — || February 6, 2006 || Mount Lemmon || Mount Lemmon Survey || — || align=right data-sort-value="0.78" | 780 m || 
|-id=143 bgcolor=#fefefe
| 454143 ||  || — || January 17, 2013 || Mount Lemmon || Mount Lemmon Survey || — || align=right data-sort-value="0.57" | 570 m || 
|-id=144 bgcolor=#E9E9E9
| 454144 ||  || — || August 14, 2010 || Kitt Peak || Spacewatch || — || align=right | 1.9 km || 
|-id=145 bgcolor=#E9E9E9
| 454145 ||  || — || October 22, 2006 || Kitt Peak || Spacewatch || — || align=right | 2.4 km || 
|-id=146 bgcolor=#fefefe
| 454146 ||  || — || January 17, 2013 || Kitt Peak || Spacewatch || — || align=right data-sort-value="0.86" | 860 m || 
|-id=147 bgcolor=#E9E9E9
| 454147 ||  || — || August 21, 2006 || Kitt Peak || Spacewatch || — || align=right | 1.5 km || 
|-id=148 bgcolor=#fefefe
| 454148 ||  || — || December 19, 2004 || Mount Lemmon || Mount Lemmon Survey || — || align=right data-sort-value="0.78" | 780 m || 
|-id=149 bgcolor=#fefefe
| 454149 ||  || — || January 23, 2006 || Kitt Peak || Spacewatch || — || align=right data-sort-value="0.54" | 540 m || 
|-id=150 bgcolor=#E9E9E9
| 454150 ||  || — || August 19, 2006 || Kitt Peak || Spacewatch || — || align=right | 1.0 km || 
|-id=151 bgcolor=#d6d6d6
| 454151 ||  || — || March 7, 2013 || Kitt Peak || Spacewatch || — || align=right | 2.0 km || 
|-id=152 bgcolor=#fefefe
| 454152 ||  || — || January 21, 2006 || Mount Lemmon || Mount Lemmon Survey || — || align=right data-sort-value="0.83" | 830 m || 
|-id=153 bgcolor=#d6d6d6
| 454153 ||  || — || November 11, 2006 || Mount Lemmon || Mount Lemmon Survey || KOR || align=right | 1.3 km || 
|-id=154 bgcolor=#E9E9E9
| 454154 ||  || — || June 25, 2010 || WISE || WISE || — || align=right | 1.4 km || 
|-id=155 bgcolor=#E9E9E9
| 454155 ||  || — || May 10, 2005 || Kitt Peak || Spacewatch || — || align=right | 1.4 km || 
|-id=156 bgcolor=#fefefe
| 454156 ||  || — || October 1, 2008 || Kitt Peak || Spacewatch || — || align=right data-sort-value="0.66" | 660 m || 
|-id=157 bgcolor=#d6d6d6
| 454157 ||  || — || July 27, 2009 || Catalina || CSS || — || align=right | 4.2 km || 
|-id=158 bgcolor=#fefefe
| 454158 ||  || — || September 18, 2007 || Kitt Peak || Spacewatch || — || align=right data-sort-value="0.88" | 880 m || 
|-id=159 bgcolor=#fefefe
| 454159 ||  || — || May 24, 2006 || Mount Lemmon || Mount Lemmon Survey || — || align=right data-sort-value="0.67" | 670 m || 
|-id=160 bgcolor=#fefefe
| 454160 ||  || — || April 17, 1999 || Kitt Peak || Spacewatch || — || align=right data-sort-value="0.74" | 740 m || 
|-id=161 bgcolor=#d6d6d6
| 454161 ||  || — || March 2, 2008 || Mount Lemmon || Mount Lemmon Survey || — || align=right | 3.3 km || 
|-id=162 bgcolor=#d6d6d6
| 454162 ||  || — || October 17, 2009 || Mount Lemmon || Mount Lemmon Survey || LIX || align=right | 3.6 km || 
|-id=163 bgcolor=#fefefe
| 454163 ||  || — || September 26, 2011 || Kitt Peak || Spacewatch || — || align=right data-sort-value="0.79" | 790 m || 
|-id=164 bgcolor=#fefefe
| 454164 ||  || — || April 10, 2002 || Socorro || LINEAR || — || align=right data-sort-value="0.90" | 900 m || 
|-id=165 bgcolor=#E9E9E9
| 454165 ||  || — || April 4, 2005 || Catalina || CSS || — || align=right | 1.2 km || 
|-id=166 bgcolor=#fefefe
| 454166 ||  || — || April 21, 2006 || Kitt Peak || Spacewatch || — || align=right data-sort-value="0.64" | 640 m || 
|-id=167 bgcolor=#d6d6d6
| 454167 ||  || — || November 6, 2010 || Mount Lemmon || Mount Lemmon Survey || — || align=right | 2.5 km || 
|-id=168 bgcolor=#E9E9E9
| 454168 ||  || — || March 12, 2013 || Mount Lemmon || Mount Lemmon Survey || — || align=right | 1.8 km || 
|-id=169 bgcolor=#d6d6d6
| 454169 ||  || — || May 15, 2008 || Mount Lemmon || Mount Lemmon Survey || — || align=right | 3.5 km || 
|-id=170 bgcolor=#d6d6d6
| 454170 ||  || — || November 10, 2010 || Mount Lemmon || Mount Lemmon Survey || — || align=right | 3.2 km || 
|-id=171 bgcolor=#E9E9E9
| 454171 ||  || — || March 5, 2013 || Kitt Peak || Spacewatch || — || align=right | 2.0 km || 
|-id=172 bgcolor=#d6d6d6
| 454172 ||  || — || August 20, 2003 || Campo Imperatore || CINEOS || HYG || align=right | 2.9 km || 
|-id=173 bgcolor=#fefefe
| 454173 ||  || — || November 19, 2008 || Mount Lemmon || Mount Lemmon Survey || — || align=right data-sort-value="0.65" | 650 m || 
|-id=174 bgcolor=#fefefe
| 454174 ||  || — || February 17, 2013 || Kitt Peak || Spacewatch || V || align=right data-sort-value="0.50" | 500 m || 
|-id=175 bgcolor=#E9E9E9
| 454175 ||  || — || March 31, 2009 || Kitt Peak || Spacewatch || — || align=right | 1.4 km || 
|-id=176 bgcolor=#fefefe
| 454176 ||  || — || September 13, 2007 || Kitt Peak || Spacewatch || V || align=right data-sort-value="0.52" | 520 m || 
|-id=177 bgcolor=#FFC2E0
| 454177 ||  || — || August 23, 2011 || Haleakala || Pan-STARRS || AMO +1km || align=right | 2.4 km || 
|-id=178 bgcolor=#fefefe
| 454178 ||  || — || January 19, 2009 || Mount Lemmon || Mount Lemmon Survey || — || align=right data-sort-value="0.80" | 800 m || 
|-id=179 bgcolor=#fefefe
| 454179 ||  || — || November 23, 2008 || Mount Lemmon || Mount Lemmon Survey || MAS || align=right data-sort-value="0.66" | 660 m || 
|-id=180 bgcolor=#E9E9E9
| 454180 ||  || — || June 1, 2009 || Catalina || CSS || — || align=right | 1.3 km || 
|-id=181 bgcolor=#E9E9E9
| 454181 ||  || — || September 30, 2010 || Mount Lemmon || Mount Lemmon Survey || — || align=right | 1.2 km || 
|-id=182 bgcolor=#E9E9E9
| 454182 ||  || — || September 19, 2006 || Kitt Peak || Spacewatch || — || align=right | 1.7 km || 
|-id=183 bgcolor=#E9E9E9
| 454183 ||  || — || March 19, 2009 || Mount Lemmon || Mount Lemmon Survey || — || align=right data-sort-value="0.89" | 890 m || 
|-id=184 bgcolor=#fefefe
| 454184 ||  || — || December 3, 2008 || Mount Lemmon || Mount Lemmon Survey || — || align=right data-sort-value="0.73" | 730 m || 
|-id=185 bgcolor=#fefefe
| 454185 ||  || — || December 21, 2008 || Kitt Peak || Spacewatch || MAS || align=right data-sort-value="0.59" | 590 m || 
|-id=186 bgcolor=#E9E9E9
| 454186 ||  || — || January 16, 2008 || Mount Lemmon || Mount Lemmon Survey || — || align=right | 3.1 km || 
|-id=187 bgcolor=#E9E9E9
| 454187 ||  || — || March 3, 2008 || Catalina || CSS || — || align=right | 2.7 km || 
|-id=188 bgcolor=#fefefe
| 454188 ||  || — || May 8, 2006 || Mount Lemmon || Mount Lemmon Survey || V || align=right data-sort-value="0.78" | 780 m || 
|-id=189 bgcolor=#E9E9E9
| 454189 ||  || — || November 17, 2007 || Mount Lemmon || Mount Lemmon Survey || EUN || align=right | 1.2 km || 
|-id=190 bgcolor=#E9E9E9
| 454190 ||  || — || March 14, 2013 || Catalina || CSS || — || align=right | 1.0 km || 
|-id=191 bgcolor=#fefefe
| 454191 ||  || — || September 11, 2007 || Mount Lemmon || Mount Lemmon Survey || — || align=right | 1.0 km || 
|-id=192 bgcolor=#E9E9E9
| 454192 ||  || — || May 1, 2009 || Kitt Peak || Spacewatch || — || align=right | 1.1 km || 
|-id=193 bgcolor=#E9E9E9
| 454193 ||  || — || March 18, 2004 || Kitt Peak || Spacewatch || LEO || align=right | 1.8 km || 
|-id=194 bgcolor=#fefefe
| 454194 ||  || — || March 1, 2009 || Kitt Peak || Spacewatch || NYS || align=right data-sort-value="0.61" | 610 m || 
|-id=195 bgcolor=#fefefe
| 454195 ||  || — || March 13, 2013 || Catalina || CSS || — || align=right data-sort-value="0.89" | 890 m || 
|-id=196 bgcolor=#fefefe
| 454196 ||  || — || February 4, 2005 || Kitt Peak || Spacewatch || MAS || align=right data-sort-value="0.65" | 650 m || 
|-id=197 bgcolor=#E9E9E9
| 454197 ||  || — || November 6, 2010 || Mount Lemmon || Mount Lemmon Survey || EUN || align=right | 1.3 km || 
|-id=198 bgcolor=#E9E9E9
| 454198 ||  || — || February 29, 2004 || Kitt Peak || Spacewatch || — || align=right | 1.7 km || 
|-id=199 bgcolor=#d6d6d6
| 454199 ||  || — || June 3, 2008 || Kitt Peak || Spacewatch || — || align=right | 2.6 km || 
|-id=200 bgcolor=#d6d6d6
| 454200 ||  || — || March 11, 2013 || Catalina || CSS || — || align=right | 2.4 km || 
|}

454201–454300 

|-bgcolor=#E9E9E9
| 454201 ||  || — || February 16, 2013 || Mount Lemmon || Mount Lemmon Survey || — || align=right | 1.5 km || 
|-id=202 bgcolor=#d6d6d6
| 454202 ||  || — || September 20, 2009 || Mount Lemmon || Mount Lemmon Survey || — || align=right | 4.1 km || 
|-id=203 bgcolor=#E9E9E9
| 454203 ||  || — || April 20, 2013 || Siding Spring || SSS || — || align=right | 1.3 km || 
|-id=204 bgcolor=#E9E9E9
| 454204 ||  || — || April 16, 2013 || Kitt Peak || Spacewatch || — || align=right | 1.9 km || 
|-id=205 bgcolor=#fefefe
| 454205 ||  || — || September 11, 2007 || Mount Lemmon || Mount Lemmon Survey || NYS || align=right data-sort-value="0.63" | 630 m || 
|-id=206 bgcolor=#E9E9E9
| 454206 ||  || — || May 26, 2000 || Kitt Peak || Spacewatch || — || align=right | 1.4 km || 
|-id=207 bgcolor=#E9E9E9
| 454207 ||  || — || October 3, 2010 || Kitt Peak || Spacewatch || — || align=right | 1.5 km || 
|-id=208 bgcolor=#E9E9E9
| 454208 ||  || — || September 10, 2010 || Mount Lemmon || Mount Lemmon Survey || — || align=right | 1.5 km || 
|-id=209 bgcolor=#E9E9E9
| 454209 ||  || — || September 26, 2006 || Kitt Peak || Spacewatch || — || align=right | 1.1 km || 
|-id=210 bgcolor=#d6d6d6
| 454210 ||  || — || October 3, 2010 || Kitt Peak || Spacewatch || EOS || align=right | 1.6 km || 
|-id=211 bgcolor=#fefefe
| 454211 ||  || — || January 1, 2009 || Kitt Peak || Spacewatch || — || align=right data-sort-value="0.74" | 740 m || 
|-id=212 bgcolor=#fefefe
| 454212 ||  || — || September 22, 2011 || Kitt Peak || Spacewatch || — || align=right data-sort-value="0.62" | 620 m || 
|-id=213 bgcolor=#E9E9E9
| 454213 ||  || — || December 1, 2006 || Mount Lemmon || Mount Lemmon Survey || HOF || align=right | 2.5 km || 
|-id=214 bgcolor=#E9E9E9
| 454214 ||  || — || February 8, 2008 || Mount Lemmon || Mount Lemmon Survey || — || align=right | 1.3 km || 
|-id=215 bgcolor=#d6d6d6
| 454215 ||  || — || January 1, 2012 || Mount Lemmon || Mount Lemmon Survey || — || align=right | 3.2 km || 
|-id=216 bgcolor=#fefefe
| 454216 ||  || — || February 28, 2009 || Kitt Peak || Spacewatch || NYS || align=right data-sort-value="0.55" | 550 m || 
|-id=217 bgcolor=#d6d6d6
| 454217 ||  || — || October 9, 2010 || Mount Lemmon || Mount Lemmon Survey || — || align=right | 2.1 km || 
|-id=218 bgcolor=#E9E9E9
| 454218 ||  || — || July 5, 2005 || Kitt Peak || Spacewatch || — || align=right | 1.7 km || 
|-id=219 bgcolor=#d6d6d6
| 454219 ||  || — || May 27, 2008 || Mount Lemmon || Mount Lemmon Survey || — || align=right | 2.5 km || 
|-id=220 bgcolor=#E9E9E9
| 454220 ||  || — || January 13, 2008 || Kitt Peak || Spacewatch || — || align=right | 1.4 km || 
|-id=221 bgcolor=#d6d6d6
| 454221 ||  || — || April 13, 2013 || Kitt Peak || Spacewatch || EOS || align=right | 2.2 km || 
|-id=222 bgcolor=#d6d6d6
| 454222 ||  || — || January 18, 2012 || Kitt Peak || Spacewatch || EOS || align=right | 1.6 km || 
|-id=223 bgcolor=#fefefe
| 454223 ||  || — || May 26, 2010 || WISE || WISE || — || align=right | 2.8 km || 
|-id=224 bgcolor=#d6d6d6
| 454224 ||  || — || December 14, 2010 || Mount Lemmon || Mount Lemmon Survey || — || align=right | 2.5 km || 
|-id=225 bgcolor=#FA8072
| 454225 ||  || — || June 9, 1999 || Kitt Peak || Spacewatch || — || align=right data-sort-value="0.62" | 620 m || 
|-id=226 bgcolor=#d6d6d6
| 454226 ||  || — || March 15, 2012 || Mount Lemmon || Mount Lemmon Survey || — || align=right | 3.0 km || 
|-id=227 bgcolor=#E9E9E9
| 454227 ||  || — || December 18, 2003 || Kitt Peak || Spacewatch || — || align=right | 1.1 km || 
|-id=228 bgcolor=#fefefe
| 454228 ||  || — || April 17, 2009 || Mount Lemmon || Mount Lemmon Survey || — || align=right data-sort-value="0.98" | 980 m || 
|-id=229 bgcolor=#E9E9E9
| 454229 ||  || — || October 2, 2006 || Mount Lemmon || Mount Lemmon Survey || — || align=right | 1.8 km || 
|-id=230 bgcolor=#E9E9E9
| 454230 ||  || — || September 28, 2006 || Kitt Peak || Spacewatch || — || align=right | 1.3 km || 
|-id=231 bgcolor=#fefefe
| 454231 ||  || — || March 25, 2006 || Kitt Peak || Spacewatch || — || align=right data-sort-value="0.64" | 640 m || 
|-id=232 bgcolor=#E9E9E9
| 454232 ||  || — || November 2, 2010 || Mount Lemmon || Mount Lemmon Survey || — || align=right | 2.3 km || 
|-id=233 bgcolor=#E9E9E9
| 454233 ||  || — || March 7, 2013 || Mount Lemmon || Mount Lemmon Survey || RAF || align=right data-sort-value="0.87" | 870 m || 
|-id=234 bgcolor=#fefefe
| 454234 ||  || — || January 17, 2009 || Kitt Peak || Spacewatch || NYS || align=right data-sort-value="0.58" | 580 m || 
|-id=235 bgcolor=#E9E9E9
| 454235 ||  || — || February 29, 2008 || Mount Lemmon || Mount Lemmon Survey || — || align=right | 1.3 km || 
|-id=236 bgcolor=#d6d6d6
| 454236 ||  || — || April 22, 2013 || Mount Lemmon || Mount Lemmon Survey || — || align=right | 2.4 km || 
|-id=237 bgcolor=#E9E9E9
| 454237 ||  || — || February 3, 2008 || Catalina || CSS || — || align=right | 2.6 km || 
|-id=238 bgcolor=#E9E9E9
| 454238 ||  || — || March 23, 2004 || Kitt Peak || Spacewatch || — || align=right | 1.2 km || 
|-id=239 bgcolor=#E9E9E9
| 454239 ||  || — || November 1, 2005 || Kitt Peak || Spacewatch || — || align=right | 1.9 km || 
|-id=240 bgcolor=#fefefe
| 454240 ||  || — || January 1, 2009 || Kitt Peak || Spacewatch || — || align=right data-sort-value="0.88" | 880 m || 
|-id=241 bgcolor=#d6d6d6
| 454241 ||  || — || January 28, 2010 || WISE || WISE || — || align=right | 3.8 km || 
|-id=242 bgcolor=#E9E9E9
| 454242 ||  || — || November 1, 2010 || Mount Lemmon || Mount Lemmon Survey || — || align=right | 2.2 km || 
|-id=243 bgcolor=#E9E9E9
| 454243 ||  || — || July 28, 2010 || WISE || WISE || — || align=right | 3.0 km || 
|-id=244 bgcolor=#d6d6d6
| 454244 ||  || — || November 4, 2004 || Kitt Peak || Spacewatch || — || align=right | 3.2 km || 
|-id=245 bgcolor=#d6d6d6
| 454245 ||  || — || June 4, 2013 || Mount Lemmon || Mount Lemmon Survey || — || align=right | 2.6 km || 
|-id=246 bgcolor=#d6d6d6
| 454246 ||  || — || April 22, 2007 || Mount Lemmon || Mount Lemmon Survey || — || align=right | 2.8 km || 
|-id=247 bgcolor=#d6d6d6
| 454247 ||  || — || May 29, 2013 || Mount Lemmon || Mount Lemmon Survey || — || align=right | 4.5 km || 
|-id=248 bgcolor=#E9E9E9
| 454248 ||  || — || May 16, 2009 || Mount Lemmon || Mount Lemmon Survey || — || align=right data-sort-value="0.95" | 950 m || 
|-id=249 bgcolor=#E9E9E9
| 454249 ||  || — || February 2, 2008 || Kitt Peak || Spacewatch || EUN || align=right | 1.1 km || 
|-id=250 bgcolor=#d6d6d6
| 454250 ||  || — || April 19, 2007 || Mount Lemmon || Mount Lemmon Survey || — || align=right | 2.4 km || 
|-id=251 bgcolor=#E9E9E9
| 454251 ||  || — || December 1, 2006 || Mount Lemmon || Mount Lemmon Survey || — || align=right | 2.3 km || 
|-id=252 bgcolor=#fefefe
| 454252 ||  || — || December 27, 2011 || Kitt Peak || Spacewatch || — || align=right data-sort-value="0.87" | 870 m || 
|-id=253 bgcolor=#d6d6d6
| 454253 ||  || — || September 26, 2008 || Kitt Peak || Spacewatch || VER || align=right | 2.3 km || 
|-id=254 bgcolor=#d6d6d6
| 454254 ||  || — || January 13, 2005 || Catalina || CSS || — || align=right | 6.0 km || 
|-id=255 bgcolor=#C2FFFF
| 454255 ||  || — || December 28, 2005 || Kitt Peak || Spacewatch || L5 || align=right | 7.9 km || 
|-id=256 bgcolor=#d6d6d6
| 454256 ||  || — || November 7, 2008 || Mount Lemmon || Mount Lemmon Survey || VER || align=right | 2.9 km || 
|-id=257 bgcolor=#C2FFFF
| 454257 ||  || — || January 11, 2008 || Kitt Peak || Spacewatch || L5 || align=right | 11 km || 
|-id=258 bgcolor=#d6d6d6
| 454258 ||  || — || March 3, 2005 || Kitt Peak || Spacewatch || — || align=right | 4.6 km || 
|-id=259 bgcolor=#d6d6d6
| 454259 ||  || — || April 25, 2006 || Kitt Peak || Spacewatch || — || align=right | 3.7 km || 
|-id=260 bgcolor=#d6d6d6
| 454260 ||  || — || October 31, 2008 || Catalina || CSS || — || align=right | 4.0 km || 
|-id=261 bgcolor=#d6d6d6
| 454261 ||  || — || April 4, 2005 || Mount Lemmon || Mount Lemmon Survey || — || align=right | 3.4 km || 
|-id=262 bgcolor=#fefefe
| 454262 ||  || — || November 28, 2005 || Mount Lemmon || Mount Lemmon Survey || H || align=right data-sort-value="0.67" | 670 m || 
|-id=263 bgcolor=#fefefe
| 454263 ||  || — || October 30, 2005 || Kitt Peak || Spacewatch || — || align=right data-sort-value="0.72" | 720 m || 
|-id=264 bgcolor=#fefefe
| 454264 ||  || — || February 25, 2006 || Mount Lemmon || Mount Lemmon Survey || H || align=right data-sort-value="0.61" | 610 m || 
|-id=265 bgcolor=#fefefe
| 454265 ||  || — || September 15, 2004 || Kitt Peak || Spacewatch || H || align=right data-sort-value="0.50" | 500 m || 
|-id=266 bgcolor=#FFC2E0
| 454266 ||  || — || October 1, 2008 || Siding Spring || SSS || AMO || align=right data-sort-value="0.59" | 590 m || 
|-id=267 bgcolor=#fefefe
| 454267 ||  || — || April 20, 2007 || Kitt Peak || Spacewatch || — || align=right data-sort-value="0.85" | 850 m || 
|-id=268 bgcolor=#fefefe
| 454268 ||  || — || March 17, 2010 || Kitt Peak || Spacewatch || — || align=right data-sort-value="0.89" | 890 m || 
|-id=269 bgcolor=#fefefe
| 454269 ||  || — || September 24, 2008 || Mount Lemmon || Mount Lemmon Survey || — || align=right data-sort-value="0.80" | 800 m || 
|-id=270 bgcolor=#fefefe
| 454270 ||  || — || October 13, 1999 || Kitt Peak || Spacewatch || — || align=right data-sort-value="0.52" | 520 m || 
|-id=271 bgcolor=#fefefe
| 454271 ||  || — || March 13, 2007 || Mount Lemmon || Mount Lemmon Survey || — || align=right data-sort-value="0.70" | 700 m || 
|-id=272 bgcolor=#fefefe
| 454272 ||  || — || December 16, 2007 || Kitt Peak || Spacewatch || H || align=right data-sort-value="0.62" | 620 m || 
|-id=273 bgcolor=#fefefe
| 454273 ||  || — || August 30, 2005 || Kitt Peak || Spacewatch || — || align=right data-sort-value="0.55" | 550 m || 
|-id=274 bgcolor=#fefefe
| 454274 ||  || — || September 18, 2011 || Mount Lemmon || Mount Lemmon Survey || NYS || align=right data-sort-value="0.61" | 610 m || 
|-id=275 bgcolor=#fefefe
| 454275 ||  || — || October 10, 2004 || Kitt Peak || Spacewatch || — || align=right data-sort-value="0.82" | 820 m || 
|-id=276 bgcolor=#fefefe
| 454276 ||  || — || April 14, 2007 || Kitt Peak || Spacewatch || — || align=right data-sort-value="0.56" | 560 m || 
|-id=277 bgcolor=#E9E9E9
| 454277 ||  || — || July 21, 2006 || Mount Lemmon || Mount Lemmon Survey || — || align=right | 1.6 km || 
|-id=278 bgcolor=#fefefe
| 454278 ||  || — || July 30, 2008 || Kitt Peak || Spacewatch || — || align=right data-sort-value="0.67" | 670 m || 
|-id=279 bgcolor=#fefefe
| 454279 ||  || — || January 27, 2007 || Mount Lemmon || Mount Lemmon Survey || — || align=right data-sort-value="0.59" | 590 m || 
|-id=280 bgcolor=#fefefe
| 454280 ||  || — || August 29, 2005 || Kitt Peak || Spacewatch || — || align=right data-sort-value="0.62" | 620 m || 
|-id=281 bgcolor=#fefefe
| 454281 ||  || — || October 10, 2008 || Kitt Peak || Spacewatch || — || align=right data-sort-value="0.64" | 640 m || 
|-id=282 bgcolor=#fefefe
| 454282 ||  || — || May 19, 2010 || Mount Lemmon || Mount Lemmon Survey || — || align=right data-sort-value="0.97" | 970 m || 
|-id=283 bgcolor=#fefefe
| 454283 ||  || — || February 20, 2006 || Mount Lemmon || Mount Lemmon Survey || — || align=right data-sort-value="0.85" | 850 m || 
|-id=284 bgcolor=#fefefe
| 454284 ||  || — || February 26, 2014 || Mount Lemmon || Mount Lemmon Survey || — || align=right data-sort-value="0.72" | 720 m || 
|-id=285 bgcolor=#fefefe
| 454285 ||  || — || June 13, 2005 || Mount Lemmon || Mount Lemmon Survey || — || align=right data-sort-value="0.66" | 660 m || 
|-id=286 bgcolor=#fefefe
| 454286 ||  || — || March 12, 2010 || Mount Lemmon || Mount Lemmon Survey || — || align=right | 1.0 km || 
|-id=287 bgcolor=#fefefe
| 454287 ||  || — || August 7, 2004 || Campo Imperatore || CINEOS || (2076) || align=right data-sort-value="0.72" | 720 m || 
|-id=288 bgcolor=#E9E9E9
| 454288 ||  || — || July 12, 2010 || WISE || WISE || — || align=right | 3.5 km || 
|-id=289 bgcolor=#fefefe
| 454289 ||  || — || October 9, 2005 || Kitt Peak || Spacewatch || — || align=right data-sort-value="0.72" | 720 m || 
|-id=290 bgcolor=#fefefe
| 454290 ||  || — || October 22, 2011 || Mount Lemmon || Mount Lemmon Survey || (5026) || align=right | 2.6 km || 
|-id=291 bgcolor=#fefefe
| 454291 ||  || — || September 10, 2007 || Kitt Peak || Spacewatch || NYS || align=right data-sort-value="0.69" | 690 m || 
|-id=292 bgcolor=#fefefe
| 454292 ||  || — || May 12, 2007 || Kitt Peak || Spacewatch || NYS || align=right data-sort-value="0.62" | 620 m || 
|-id=293 bgcolor=#fefefe
| 454293 ||  || — || September 20, 2011 || Catalina || CSS || critical || align=right data-sort-value="0.75" | 750 m || 
|-id=294 bgcolor=#fefefe
| 454294 ||  || — || December 26, 2005 || Kitt Peak || Spacewatch || — || align=right | 1.0 km || 
|-id=295 bgcolor=#fefefe
| 454295 ||  || — || April 2, 2009 || Kitt Peak || Spacewatch || H || align=right data-sort-value="0.83" | 830 m || 
|-id=296 bgcolor=#E9E9E9
| 454296 ||  || — || January 31, 2009 || Mount Lemmon || Mount Lemmon Survey || EUN || align=right | 1.2 km || 
|-id=297 bgcolor=#fefefe
| 454297 ||  || — || February 26, 2007 || Mount Lemmon || Mount Lemmon Survey || — || align=right data-sort-value="0.74" | 740 m || 
|-id=298 bgcolor=#fefefe
| 454298 ||  || — || January 5, 2003 || Socorro || LINEAR || H || align=right data-sort-value="0.80" | 800 m || 
|-id=299 bgcolor=#E9E9E9
| 454299 ||  || — || May 10, 2010 || WISE || WISE || DOR || align=right | 2.5 km || 
|-id=300 bgcolor=#fefefe
| 454300 ||  || — || June 4, 2011 || Mount Lemmon || Mount Lemmon Survey || — || align=right data-sort-value="0.61" | 610 m || 
|}

454301–454400 

|-bgcolor=#fefefe
| 454301 ||  || — || October 12, 2005 || Kitt Peak || Spacewatch || — || align=right data-sort-value="0.60" | 600 m || 
|-id=302 bgcolor=#d6d6d6
| 454302 ||  || — || June 9, 2010 || WISE || WISE || — || align=right | 2.5 km || 
|-id=303 bgcolor=#fefefe
| 454303 ||  || — || May 5, 2014 || Mount Lemmon || Mount Lemmon Survey || (2076) || align=right data-sort-value="0.82" | 820 m || 
|-id=304 bgcolor=#fefefe
| 454304 ||  || — || November 7, 2007 || Mount Lemmon || Mount Lemmon Survey || H || align=right data-sort-value="0.78" | 780 m || 
|-id=305 bgcolor=#fefefe
| 454305 ||  || — || May 31, 2010 || WISE || WISE || — || align=right | 2.0 km || 
|-id=306 bgcolor=#fefefe
| 454306 ||  || — || November 7, 2008 || Mount Lemmon || Mount Lemmon Survey || — || align=right data-sort-value="0.76" | 760 m || 
|-id=307 bgcolor=#fefefe
| 454307 ||  || — || November 1, 2008 || Kitt Peak || Spacewatch || — || align=right data-sort-value="0.70" | 700 m || 
|-id=308 bgcolor=#E9E9E9
| 454308 ||  || — || May 19, 2005 || Mount Lemmon || Mount Lemmon Survey || — || align=right | 1.8 km || 
|-id=309 bgcolor=#fefefe
| 454309 ||  || — || September 29, 2011 || Kitt Peak || Spacewatch || NYScritical || align=right data-sort-value="0.69" | 690 m || 
|-id=310 bgcolor=#fefefe
| 454310 ||  || — || August 31, 2000 || Socorro || LINEAR || — || align=right | 1.0 km || 
|-id=311 bgcolor=#fefefe
| 454311 ||  || — || September 23, 2011 || Kitt Peak || Spacewatch || — || align=right data-sort-value="0.73" | 730 m || 
|-id=312 bgcolor=#fefefe
| 454312 ||  || — || September 10, 2007 || Kitt Peak || Spacewatch || — || align=right data-sort-value="0.68" | 680 m || 
|-id=313 bgcolor=#fefefe
| 454313 ||  || — || August 29, 2005 || Kitt Peak || Spacewatch || — || align=right data-sort-value="0.48" | 480 m || 
|-id=314 bgcolor=#E9E9E9
| 454314 ||  || — || May 13, 2010 || WISE || WISE || — || align=right | 1.7 km || 
|-id=315 bgcolor=#E9E9E9
| 454315 ||  || — || June 16, 2010 || Mount Lemmon || Mount Lemmon Survey || — || align=right data-sort-value="0.90" | 900 m || 
|-id=316 bgcolor=#d6d6d6
| 454316 ||  || — || October 7, 2005 || Kitt Peak || Spacewatch || — || align=right | 2.9 km || 
|-id=317 bgcolor=#E9E9E9
| 454317 ||  || — || October 21, 2011 || Mount Lemmon || Mount Lemmon Survey || EUN || align=right | 1.1 km || 
|-id=318 bgcolor=#fefefe
| 454318 ||  || — || October 3, 2008 || Mount Lemmon || Mount Lemmon Survey || — || align=right data-sort-value="0.64" | 640 m || 
|-id=319 bgcolor=#E9E9E9
| 454319 ||  || — || September 25, 2006 || Catalina || CSS || — || align=right | 1.7 km || 
|-id=320 bgcolor=#E9E9E9
| 454320 ||  || — || October 12, 2007 || Mount Lemmon || Mount Lemmon Survey || — || align=right data-sort-value="0.88" | 880 m || 
|-id=321 bgcolor=#fefefe
| 454321 ||  || — || August 28, 2011 || Siding Spring || SSS || — || align=right data-sort-value="0.90" | 900 m || 
|-id=322 bgcolor=#d6d6d6
| 454322 ||  || — || September 17, 2009 || Mount Lemmon || Mount Lemmon Survey || — || align=right | 2.1 km || 
|-id=323 bgcolor=#fefefe
| 454323 ||  || — || November 3, 2010 || Kitt Peak || Spacewatch || H || align=right data-sort-value="0.78" | 780 m || 
|-id=324 bgcolor=#FA8072
| 454324 ||  || — || May 24, 2001 || Kitt Peak || Spacewatch || H || align=right data-sort-value="0.62" | 620 m || 
|-id=325 bgcolor=#fefefe
| 454325 ||  || — || January 1, 2008 || Catalina || CSS || H || align=right data-sort-value="0.86" | 860 m || 
|-id=326 bgcolor=#E9E9E9
| 454326 Donlee ||  ||  || May 17, 2010 || WISE || WISE || — || align=right | 2.5 km || 
|-id=327 bgcolor=#fefefe
| 454327 ||  || — || October 8, 2007 || Mount Lemmon || Mount Lemmon Survey || — || align=right data-sort-value="0.68" | 680 m || 
|-id=328 bgcolor=#E9E9E9
| 454328 ||  || — || November 15, 2007 || Catalina || CSS || — || align=right | 1.9 km || 
|-id=329 bgcolor=#E9E9E9
| 454329 Ericpiquette ||  ||  || June 10, 2010 || WISE || WISE || — || align=right | 2.1 km || 
|-id=330 bgcolor=#fefefe
| 454330 ||  || — || July 16, 2004 || Campo Imperatore || CINEOS || — || align=right data-sort-value="0.84" | 840 m || 
|-id=331 bgcolor=#fefefe
| 454331 ||  || — || September 22, 2008 || Kitt Peak || Spacewatch || — || align=right data-sort-value="0.56" | 560 m || 
|-id=332 bgcolor=#fefefe
| 454332 ||  || — || January 10, 2003 || Socorro || LINEAR || H || align=right data-sort-value="0.79" | 790 m || 
|-id=333 bgcolor=#fefefe
| 454333 ||  || — || October 27, 2005 || Kitt Peak || Spacewatch || — || align=right data-sort-value="0.68" | 680 m || 
|-id=334 bgcolor=#fefefe
| 454334 ||  || — || September 16, 2004 || Anderson Mesa || LONEOS || — || align=right data-sort-value="0.82" | 820 m || 
|-id=335 bgcolor=#E9E9E9
| 454335 ||  || — || August 9, 2010 || XuYi || PMO NEO || — || align=right | 1.7 km || 
|-id=336 bgcolor=#fefefe
| 454336 ||  || — || December 30, 2008 || Kitt Peak || Spacewatch || — || align=right | 2.5 km || 
|-id=337 bgcolor=#fefefe
| 454337 ||  || — || April 22, 2007 || Kitt Peak || Spacewatch || — || align=right data-sort-value="0.67" | 670 m || 
|-id=338 bgcolor=#fefefe
| 454338 ||  || — || October 25, 2012 || Mount Lemmon || Mount Lemmon Survey || H || align=right data-sort-value="0.78" | 780 m || 
|-id=339 bgcolor=#d6d6d6
| 454339 ||  || — || January 18, 2012 || Mount Lemmon || Mount Lemmon Survey || — || align=right | 3.4 km || 
|-id=340 bgcolor=#fefefe
| 454340 ||  || — || October 26, 2008 || Kitt Peak || Spacewatch || — || align=right data-sort-value="0.67" | 670 m || 
|-id=341 bgcolor=#fefefe
| 454341 ||  || — || December 29, 2008 || Mount Lemmon || Mount Lemmon Survey || — || align=right | 1.1 km || 
|-id=342 bgcolor=#E9E9E9
| 454342 ||  || — || June 3, 2005 || Siding Spring || SSS || — || align=right | 2.2 km || 
|-id=343 bgcolor=#fefefe
| 454343 ||  || — || September 13, 2007 || Kitt Peak || Spacewatch || — || align=right data-sort-value="0.76" | 760 m || 
|-id=344 bgcolor=#fefefe
| 454344 ||  || — || March 25, 2006 || Kitt Peak || Spacewatch || — || align=right data-sort-value="0.68" | 680 m || 
|-id=345 bgcolor=#fefefe
| 454345 ||  || — || October 13, 2004 || Kitt Peak || Spacewatch || — || align=right data-sort-value="0.77" | 770 m || 
|-id=346 bgcolor=#E9E9E9
| 454346 ||  || — || June 18, 2010 || Mount Lemmon || Mount Lemmon Survey || — || align=right | 1.2 km || 
|-id=347 bgcolor=#fefefe
| 454347 ||  || — || November 18, 2007 || Catalina || CSS || H || align=right data-sort-value="0.64" | 640 m || 
|-id=348 bgcolor=#fefefe
| 454348 ||  || — || March 15, 2004 || Kitt Peak || Spacewatch || — || align=right data-sort-value="0.58" | 580 m || 
|-id=349 bgcolor=#E9E9E9
| 454349 ||  || — || September 25, 2006 || Catalina || CSS || — || align=right | 2.0 km || 
|-id=350 bgcolor=#E9E9E9
| 454350 Paolaamico ||  ||  || April 30, 2010 || WISE || WISE || — || align=right | 2.5 km || 
|-id=351 bgcolor=#E9E9E9
| 454351 ||  || — || December 4, 2007 || Kitt Peak || Spacewatch || (5) || align=right | 1.2 km || 
|-id=352 bgcolor=#E9E9E9
| 454352 Majidzandian ||  ||  || July 3, 2010 || WISE || WISE || — || align=right | 4.2 km || 
|-id=353 bgcolor=#fefefe
| 454353 ||  || — || April 5, 2003 || Kitt Peak || Spacewatch || — || align=right data-sort-value="0.70" | 700 m || 
|-id=354 bgcolor=#E9E9E9
| 454354 ||  || — || March 15, 2009 || Kitt Peak || Spacewatch || — || align=right | 1.5 km || 
|-id=355 bgcolor=#E9E9E9
| 454355 ||  || — || November 19, 2007 || Kitt Peak || Spacewatch || — || align=right | 1.5 km || 
|-id=356 bgcolor=#fefefe
| 454356 ||  || — || May 2, 2006 || Mount Lemmon || Mount Lemmon Survey || — || align=right data-sort-value="0.75" | 750 m || 
|-id=357 bgcolor=#E9E9E9
| 454357 ||  || — || February 28, 2008 || Mount Lemmon || Mount Lemmon Survey || — || align=right | 2.4 km || 
|-id=358 bgcolor=#d6d6d6
| 454358 ||  || — || June 21, 2014 || Mount Lemmon || Mount Lemmon Survey || — || align=right | 2.8 km || 
|-id=359 bgcolor=#d6d6d6
| 454359 ||  || — || January 30, 2012 || Kitt Peak || Spacewatch || — || align=right | 2.8 km || 
|-id=360 bgcolor=#fefefe
| 454360 ||  || — || September 23, 2004 || Kitt Peak || Spacewatch || — || align=right data-sort-value="0.76" | 760 m || 
|-id=361 bgcolor=#E9E9E9
| 454361 ||  || — || February 6, 2013 || Kitt Peak || Spacewatch || — || align=right | 1.8 km || 
|-id=362 bgcolor=#d6d6d6
| 454362 ||  || — || January 7, 2006 || Mount Lemmon || Mount Lemmon Survey || — || align=right | 3.2 km || 
|-id=363 bgcolor=#fefefe
| 454363 ||  || — || April 7, 2003 || Kitt Peak || Spacewatch || — || align=right data-sort-value="0.73" | 730 m || 
|-id=364 bgcolor=#d6d6d6
| 454364 ||  || — || September 26, 2009 || Mount Lemmon || Mount Lemmon Survey || — || align=right | 2.4 km || 
|-id=365 bgcolor=#E9E9E9
| 454365 ||  || — || September 29, 2005 || Kitt Peak || Spacewatch || AGN || align=right | 1.3 km || 
|-id=366 bgcolor=#fefefe
| 454366 ||  || — || May 22, 2006 || Kitt Peak || Spacewatch || — || align=right | 1.1 km || 
|-id=367 bgcolor=#E9E9E9
| 454367 ||  || — || May 4, 2005 || Kitt Peak || Spacewatch || — || align=right | 1.8 km || 
|-id=368 bgcolor=#d6d6d6
| 454368 ||  || — || September 14, 2009 || Catalina || CSS || EOS || align=right | 2.2 km || 
|-id=369 bgcolor=#fefefe
| 454369 ||  || — || April 5, 2010 || Kitt Peak || Spacewatch || — || align=right data-sort-value="0.75" | 750 m || 
|-id=370 bgcolor=#fefefe
| 454370 ||  || — || February 3, 2009 || Mount Lemmon || Mount Lemmon Survey || — || align=right | 1.00 km || 
|-id=371 bgcolor=#fefefe
| 454371 ||  || — || February 25, 2006 || Kitt Peak || Spacewatch || — || align=right data-sort-value="0.68" | 680 m || 
|-id=372 bgcolor=#E9E9E9
| 454372 ||  || — || April 22, 2009 || Mount Lemmon || Mount Lemmon Survey || — || align=right | 1.6 km || 
|-id=373 bgcolor=#E9E9E9
| 454373 ||  || — || August 26, 2005 || Siding Spring || SSS || — || align=right | 2.4 km || 
|-id=374 bgcolor=#fefefe
| 454374 ||  || — || May 22, 2003 || Kitt Peak || Spacewatch || — || align=right data-sort-value="0.75" | 750 m || 
|-id=375 bgcolor=#E9E9E9
| 454375 ||  || — || November 22, 2011 || Mount Lemmon || Mount Lemmon Survey || — || align=right | 2.2 km || 
|-id=376 bgcolor=#E9E9E9
| 454376 ||  || — || August 18, 2006 || Kitt Peak || Spacewatch || — || align=right | 1.3 km || 
|-id=377 bgcolor=#E9E9E9
| 454377 ||  || — || March 12, 2013 || Siding Spring || SSS || — || align=right | 1.4 km || 
|-id=378 bgcolor=#d6d6d6
| 454378 ||  || — || January 17, 2007 || Kitt Peak || Spacewatch || — || align=right | 1.9 km || 
|-id=379 bgcolor=#fefefe
| 454379 ||  || — || March 16, 2010 || Mount Lemmon || Mount Lemmon Survey || — || align=right data-sort-value="0.65" | 650 m || 
|-id=380 bgcolor=#fefefe
| 454380 ||  || — || October 22, 2011 || Mount Lemmon || Mount Lemmon Survey || — || align=right data-sort-value="0.68" | 680 m || 
|-id=381 bgcolor=#E9E9E9
| 454381 ||  || — || November 16, 2006 || Kitt Peak || Spacewatch || — || align=right | 2.5 km || 
|-id=382 bgcolor=#d6d6d6
| 454382 ||  || — || October 5, 2004 || Kitt Peak || Spacewatch || — || align=right | 2.4 km || 
|-id=383 bgcolor=#E9E9E9
| 454383 ||  || — || January 12, 2008 || Mount Lemmon || Mount Lemmon Survey || — || align=right | 3.2 km || 
|-id=384 bgcolor=#d6d6d6
| 454384 ||  || — || January 24, 2007 || Mount Lemmon || Mount Lemmon Survey || — || align=right | 2.6 km || 
|-id=385 bgcolor=#d6d6d6
| 454385 ||  || — || May 8, 2008 || Mount Lemmon || Mount Lemmon Survey || — || align=right | 2.5 km || 
|-id=386 bgcolor=#fefefe
| 454386 ||  || — || January 16, 2013 || Mount Lemmon || Mount Lemmon Survey || — || align=right data-sort-value="0.79" | 790 m || 
|-id=387 bgcolor=#fefefe
| 454387 ||  || — || December 16, 2007 || Mount Lemmon || Mount Lemmon Survey || H || align=right data-sort-value="0.85" | 850 m || 
|-id=388 bgcolor=#fefefe
| 454388 ||  || — || December 18, 2004 || Mount Lemmon || Mount Lemmon Survey || H || align=right data-sort-value="0.65" | 650 m || 
|-id=389 bgcolor=#E9E9E9
| 454389 ||  || — || June 26, 2006 || Siding Spring || SSS || — || align=right | 1.3 km || 
|-id=390 bgcolor=#fefefe
| 454390 ||  || — || April 24, 2006 || Kitt Peak || Spacewatch || — || align=right data-sort-value="0.86" | 860 m || 
|-id=391 bgcolor=#d6d6d6
| 454391 ||  || — || April 9, 2003 || Kitt Peak || Spacewatch || — || align=right | 4.0 km || 
|-id=392 bgcolor=#fefefe
| 454392 ||  || — || January 10, 2006 || Kitt Peak || Spacewatch || — || align=right | 1.1 km || 
|-id=393 bgcolor=#E9E9E9
| 454393 ||  || — || December 17, 2007 || Mount Lemmon || Mount Lemmon Survey || — || align=right | 1.4 km || 
|-id=394 bgcolor=#d6d6d6
| 454394 ||  || — || September 30, 2009 || Mount Lemmon || Mount Lemmon Survey || — || align=right | 2.4 km || 
|-id=395 bgcolor=#d6d6d6
| 454395 ||  || — || October 27, 2005 || Mount Lemmon || Mount Lemmon Survey || — || align=right | 3.1 km || 
|-id=396 bgcolor=#fefefe
| 454396 ||  || — || December 22, 2008 || Kitt Peak || Spacewatch || V || align=right data-sort-value="0.72" | 720 m || 
|-id=397 bgcolor=#E9E9E9
| 454397 ||  || — || January 13, 2008 || Kitt Peak || Spacewatch || — || align=right | 1.0 km || 
|-id=398 bgcolor=#fefefe
| 454398 ||  || — || October 22, 2011 || Mount Lemmon || Mount Lemmon Survey || — || align=right data-sort-value="0.69" | 690 m || 
|-id=399 bgcolor=#E9E9E9
| 454399 ||  || — || January 13, 2008 || Kitt Peak || Spacewatch || — || align=right | 1.2 km || 
|-id=400 bgcolor=#fefefe
| 454400 ||  || — || October 9, 2007 || XuYi || PMO NEO || — || align=right data-sort-value="0.97" | 970 m || 
|}

454401–454500 

|-bgcolor=#d6d6d6
| 454401 ||  || — || April 26, 2007 || Mount Lemmon || Mount Lemmon Survey || — || align=right | 3.4 km || 
|-id=402 bgcolor=#E9E9E9
| 454402 ||  || — || November 23, 2006 || Kitt Peak || Spacewatch || — || align=right | 2.6 km || 
|-id=403 bgcolor=#fefefe
| 454403 ||  || — || May 16, 2010 || Mount Lemmon || Mount Lemmon Survey || — || align=right | 1.1 km || 
|-id=404 bgcolor=#d6d6d6
| 454404 ||  || — || January 21, 2006 || Kitt Peak || Spacewatch || — || align=right | 3.8 km || 
|-id=405 bgcolor=#d6d6d6
| 454405 ||  || — || October 23, 2009 || Catalina || CSS || Tj (2.96) || align=right | 5.2 km || 
|-id=406 bgcolor=#E9E9E9
| 454406 ||  || — || September 5, 2010 || Mount Lemmon || Mount Lemmon Survey || EUN || align=right data-sort-value="0.99" | 990 m || 
|-id=407 bgcolor=#d6d6d6
| 454407 ||  || — || September 21, 2009 || Mount Lemmon || Mount Lemmon Survey || — || align=right | 2.2 km || 
|-id=408 bgcolor=#E9E9E9
| 454408 ||  || — || September 6, 2010 || Mount Lemmon || Mount Lemmon Survey || — || align=right | 1.2 km || 
|-id=409 bgcolor=#E9E9E9
| 454409 Markusloose ||  ||  || May 25, 2010 || WISE || WISE || — || align=right | 1.5 km || 
|-id=410 bgcolor=#fefefe
| 454410 ||  || — || November 19, 2003 || Kitt Peak || Spacewatch || — || align=right | 1.4 km || 
|-id=411 bgcolor=#d6d6d6
| 454411 ||  || — || September 16, 2003 || Kitt Peak || Spacewatch || critical || align=right | 2.9 km || 
|-id=412 bgcolor=#fefefe
| 454412 ||  || — || September 23, 2011 || Kitt Peak || Spacewatch || — || align=right data-sort-value="0.84" | 840 m || 
|-id=413 bgcolor=#d6d6d6
| 454413 ||  || — || October 1, 2005 || Mount Lemmon || Mount Lemmon Survey || — || align=right | 2.0 km || 
|-id=414 bgcolor=#E9E9E9
| 454414 ||  || — || August 30, 2005 || Kitt Peak || Spacewatch || AGN || align=right | 1.5 km || 
|-id=415 bgcolor=#d6d6d6
| 454415 ||  || — || November 10, 2004 || Kitt Peak || Spacewatch || — || align=right | 2.8 km || 
|-id=416 bgcolor=#d6d6d6
| 454416 ||  || — || December 3, 2010 || Kitt Peak || Spacewatch || — || align=right | 3.0 km || 
|-id=417 bgcolor=#d6d6d6
| 454417 ||  || — || December 18, 2004 || Mount Lemmon || Mount Lemmon Survey || — || align=right | 3.2 km || 
|-id=418 bgcolor=#d6d6d6
| 454418 ||  || — || March 31, 2008 || Mount Lemmon || Mount Lemmon Survey || — || align=right | 3.1 km || 
|-id=419 bgcolor=#E9E9E9
| 454419 Hansklausreif ||  ||  || May 21, 2010 || WISE || WISE || — || align=right | 2.2 km || 
|-id=420 bgcolor=#d6d6d6
| 454420 ||  || — || December 28, 2005 || Mount Lemmon || Mount Lemmon Survey || — || align=right | 2.7 km || 
|-id=421 bgcolor=#E9E9E9
| 454421 ||  || — || November 18, 2007 || Mount Lemmon || Mount Lemmon Survey || — || align=right | 3.1 km || 
|-id=422 bgcolor=#fefefe
| 454422 ||  || — || January 1, 2009 || Mount Lemmon || Mount Lemmon Survey || — || align=right data-sort-value="0.95" | 950 m || 
|-id=423 bgcolor=#E9E9E9
| 454423 ||  || — || December 15, 1998 || Caussols || ODAS || — || align=right | 1.5 km || 
|-id=424 bgcolor=#E9E9E9
| 454424 ||  || — || November 18, 2007 || Mount Lemmon || Mount Lemmon Survey || — || align=right | 1.7 km || 
|-id=425 bgcolor=#E9E9E9
| 454425 ||  || — || September 18, 2006 || Kitt Peak || Spacewatch || — || align=right | 1.3 km || 
|-id=426 bgcolor=#d6d6d6
| 454426 ||  || — || December 28, 2005 || Mount Lemmon || Mount Lemmon Survey || — || align=right | 2.6 km || 
|-id=427 bgcolor=#d6d6d6
| 454427 ||  || — || October 9, 2004 || Kitt Peak || Spacewatch || — || align=right | 1.8 km || 
|-id=428 bgcolor=#E9E9E9
| 454428 ||  || — || April 10, 2013 || Mount Lemmon || Mount Lemmon Survey || — || align=right | 1.9 km || 
|-id=429 bgcolor=#d6d6d6
| 454429 ||  || — || September 19, 2003 || Campo Imperatore || CINEOS || — || align=right | 2.9 km || 
|-id=430 bgcolor=#fefefe
| 454430 ||  || — || January 10, 2006 || Mount Lemmon || Mount Lemmon Survey || — || align=right data-sort-value="0.71" | 710 m || 
|-id=431 bgcolor=#fefefe
| 454431 ||  || — || April 18, 2007 || Mount Lemmon || Mount Lemmon Survey || — || align=right data-sort-value="0.56" | 560 m || 
|-id=432 bgcolor=#d6d6d6
| 454432 ||  || — || December 30, 2005 || Kitt Peak || Spacewatch || EOS || align=right | 1.8 km || 
|-id=433 bgcolor=#E9E9E9
| 454433 ||  || — || February 24, 2008 || Mount Lemmon || Mount Lemmon Survey || — || align=right | 1.9 km || 
|-id=434 bgcolor=#E9E9E9
| 454434 ||  || — || August 30, 2005 || Kitt Peak || Spacewatch || AGN || align=right data-sort-value="0.96" | 960 m || 
|-id=435 bgcolor=#E9E9E9
| 454435 ||  || — || October 28, 2006 || Mount Lemmon || Mount Lemmon Survey || — || align=right | 1.1 km || 
|-id=436 bgcolor=#E9E9E9
| 454436 ||  || — || December 10, 2006 || Kitt Peak || Spacewatch || AGN || align=right | 1.0 km || 
|-id=437 bgcolor=#fefefe
| 454437 ||  || — || October 30, 2007 || Mount Lemmon || Mount Lemmon Survey || — || align=right data-sort-value="0.76" | 760 m || 
|-id=438 bgcolor=#E9E9E9
| 454438 ||  || — || September 28, 2006 || Kitt Peak || Spacewatch || — || align=right | 1.4 km || 
|-id=439 bgcolor=#d6d6d6
| 454439 ||  || — || September 18, 2003 || Kitt Peak || Spacewatch || — || align=right | 2.0 km || 
|-id=440 bgcolor=#E9E9E9
| 454440 ||  || — || February 28, 2008 || Mount Lemmon || Mount Lemmon Survey || — || align=right | 1.9 km || 
|-id=441 bgcolor=#d6d6d6
| 454441 ||  || — || September 21, 2009 || Kitt Peak || Spacewatch || — || align=right | 2.4 km || 
|-id=442 bgcolor=#E9E9E9
| 454442 ||  || — || September 27, 2006 || Mount Lemmon || Mount Lemmon Survey || — || align=right | 1.1 km || 
|-id=443 bgcolor=#E9E9E9
| 454443 ||  || — || November 29, 2011 || Mount Lemmon || Mount Lemmon Survey || — || align=right | 1.9 km || 
|-id=444 bgcolor=#E9E9E9
| 454444 ||  || — || October 16, 2006 || Kitt Peak || Spacewatch ||  || align=right | 1.2 km || 
|-id=445 bgcolor=#E9E9E9
| 454445 ||  || — || December 15, 2007 || Kitt Peak || Spacewatch || — || align=right | 1.1 km || 
|-id=446 bgcolor=#E9E9E9
| 454446 ||  || — || September 4, 2010 || Kitt Peak || Spacewatch || — || align=right | 1.9 km || 
|-id=447 bgcolor=#E9E9E9
| 454447 ||  || — || December 17, 2007 || Kitt Peak || Spacewatch || — || align=right data-sort-value="0.82" | 820 m || 
|-id=448 bgcolor=#E9E9E9
| 454448 ||  || — || January 11, 2008 || Kitt Peak || Spacewatch || — || align=right | 1.1 km || 
|-id=449 bgcolor=#d6d6d6
| 454449 ||  || — || October 1, 1995 || Kitt Peak || Spacewatch || KOR || align=right data-sort-value="0.96" | 960 m || 
|-id=450 bgcolor=#E9E9E9
| 454450 ||  || — || March 16, 2005 || Catalina || CSS || EUN || align=right data-sort-value="0.96" | 960 m || 
|-id=451 bgcolor=#d6d6d6
| 454451 ||  || — || October 26, 2009 || Kitt Peak || Spacewatch || THM || align=right | 2.0 km || 
|-id=452 bgcolor=#E9E9E9
| 454452 ||  || — || October 22, 2006 || Mount Lemmon || Mount Lemmon Survey || — || align=right | 1.4 km || 
|-id=453 bgcolor=#E9E9E9
| 454453 ||  || — || December 17, 2003 || Kitt Peak || Spacewatch || — || align=right | 1.0 km || 
|-id=454 bgcolor=#d6d6d6
| 454454 ||  || — || November 10, 2010 || Mount Lemmon || Mount Lemmon Survey || KOR || align=right data-sort-value="0.97" | 970 m || 
|-id=455 bgcolor=#E9E9E9
| 454455 ||  || — || September 30, 2010 || Mount Lemmon || Mount Lemmon Survey || NEM || align=right | 1.9 km || 
|-id=456 bgcolor=#E9E9E9
| 454456 ||  || — || March 29, 2009 || Kitt Peak || Spacewatch || (5) || align=right data-sort-value="0.79" | 790 m || 
|-id=457 bgcolor=#E9E9E9
| 454457 ||  || — || October 16, 2001 || Kitt Peak || Spacewatch || — || align=right | 1.7 km || 
|-id=458 bgcolor=#fefefe
| 454458 ||  || — || September 10, 2007 || Kitt Peak || Spacewatch || — || align=right data-sort-value="0.65" | 650 m || 
|-id=459 bgcolor=#E9E9E9
| 454459 ||  || — || November 20, 2007 || Kitt Peak || Spacewatch || — || align=right data-sort-value="0.94" | 940 m || 
|-id=460 bgcolor=#d6d6d6
| 454460 ||  || — || October 31, 2005 || Kitt Peak || Spacewatch || KOR || align=right | 1.2 km || 
|-id=461 bgcolor=#d6d6d6
| 454461 ||  || — || October 8, 2005 || Kitt Peak || Spacewatch || KOR || align=right | 1.1 km || 
|-id=462 bgcolor=#E9E9E9
| 454462 ||  || — || September 26, 2006 || Mount Lemmon || Mount Lemmon Survey || — || align=right | 1.1 km || 
|-id=463 bgcolor=#E9E9E9
| 454463 ||  || — || January 26, 2012 || Mount Lemmon || Mount Lemmon Survey || HOF || align=right | 2.6 km || 
|-id=464 bgcolor=#d6d6d6
| 454464 ||  || — || December 10, 2010 || Mount Lemmon || Mount Lemmon Survey || — || align=right | 2.4 km || 
|-id=465 bgcolor=#E9E9E9
| 454465 ||  || — || September 1, 2005 || Kitt Peak || Spacewatch || — || align=right | 2.0 km || 
|-id=466 bgcolor=#E9E9E9
| 454466 ||  || — || October 22, 2006 || Catalina || CSS || — || align=right | 1.5 km || 
|-id=467 bgcolor=#d6d6d6
| 454467 ||  || — || February 17, 2007 || Mount Lemmon || Mount Lemmon Survey || — || align=right | 2.8 km || 
|-id=468 bgcolor=#E9E9E9
| 454468 ||  || — || June 28, 2014 || Kitt Peak || Spacewatch || EUN || align=right data-sort-value="0.98" | 980 m || 
|-id=469 bgcolor=#fefefe
| 454469 ||  || — || May 30, 2003 || Socorro || LINEAR || — || align=right data-sort-value="0.91" | 910 m || 
|-id=470 bgcolor=#E9E9E9
| 454470 ||  || — || May 4, 2005 || Kitt Peak || Spacewatch || — || align=right | 2.4 km || 
|-id=471 bgcolor=#E9E9E9
| 454471 ||  || — || October 31, 2006 || Catalina || CSS || JUN || align=right | 1.2 km || 
|-id=472 bgcolor=#fefefe
| 454472 ||  || — || September 20, 1995 || Kitt Peak || Spacewatch || — || align=right data-sort-value="0.98" | 980 m || 
|-id=473 bgcolor=#fefefe
| 454473 ||  || — || September 29, 1994 || Kitt Peak || Spacewatch || — || align=right data-sort-value="0.72" | 720 m || 
|-id=474 bgcolor=#d6d6d6
| 454474 ||  || — || November 30, 2005 || Mount Lemmon || Mount Lemmon Survey || — || align=right | 2.0 km || 
|-id=475 bgcolor=#d6d6d6
| 454475 ||  || — || December 30, 2005 || Kitt Peak || Spacewatch || — || align=right | 2.7 km || 
|-id=476 bgcolor=#E9E9E9
| 454476 ||  || — || April 3, 2008 || Kitt Peak || Spacewatch || — || align=right | 2.1 km || 
|-id=477 bgcolor=#E9E9E9
| 454477 ||  || — || November 4, 2010 || Mount Lemmon || Mount Lemmon Survey || GEF || align=right | 1.4 km || 
|-id=478 bgcolor=#fefefe
| 454478 ||  || — || May 6, 2006 || Mount Lemmon || Mount Lemmon Survey || — || align=right data-sort-value="0.86" | 860 m || 
|-id=479 bgcolor=#d6d6d6
| 454479 ||  || — || December 14, 2010 || Mount Lemmon || Mount Lemmon Survey || — || align=right | 3.2 km || 
|-id=480 bgcolor=#fefefe
| 454480 ||  || — || March 13, 2007 || Mount Lemmon || Mount Lemmon Survey || — || align=right data-sort-value="0.56" | 560 m || 
|-id=481 bgcolor=#E9E9E9
| 454481 ||  || — || July 4, 2005 || Mount Lemmon || Mount Lemmon Survey || — || align=right | 2.0 km || 
|-id=482 bgcolor=#d6d6d6
| 454482 ||  || — || December 30, 2005 || Mount Lemmon || Mount Lemmon Survey || EOS || align=right | 1.8 km || 
|-id=483 bgcolor=#E9E9E9
| 454483 ||  || — || September 19, 2006 || Kitt Peak || Spacewatch || — || align=right | 1.1 km || 
|-id=484 bgcolor=#E9E9E9
| 454484 ||  || — || December 21, 2006 || Kitt Peak || Spacewatch || HOF || align=right | 3.0 km || 
|-id=485 bgcolor=#fefefe
| 454485 ||  || — || February 21, 1995 || Kitt Peak || Spacewatch || — || align=right data-sort-value="0.86" | 860 m || 
|-id=486 bgcolor=#E9E9E9
| 454486 ||  || — || November 26, 2011 || Mount Lemmon || Mount Lemmon Survey || — || align=right | 2.3 km || 
|-id=487 bgcolor=#E9E9E9
| 454487 ||  || — || October 21, 2006 || Mount Lemmon || Mount Lemmon Survey || — || align=right | 1.2 km || 
|-id=488 bgcolor=#E9E9E9
| 454488 ||  || — || September 28, 2006 || Kitt Peak || Spacewatch || — || align=right | 1.1 km || 
|-id=489 bgcolor=#fefefe
| 454489 ||  || — || March 26, 2006 || Kitt Peak || Spacewatch || — || align=right data-sort-value="0.86" | 860 m || 
|-id=490 bgcolor=#fefefe
| 454490 ||  || — || February 9, 2010 || Mount Lemmon || Mount Lemmon Survey || — || align=right data-sort-value="0.59" | 590 m || 
|-id=491 bgcolor=#d6d6d6
| 454491 ||  || — || April 11, 2013 || Mount Lemmon || Mount Lemmon Survey || VER || align=right | 2.3 km || 
|-id=492 bgcolor=#E9E9E9
| 454492 ||  || — || November 16, 2006 || Mount Lemmon || Mount Lemmon Survey || — || align=right | 1.4 km || 
|-id=493 bgcolor=#fefefe
| 454493 ||  || — || November 25, 2000 || Kitt Peak || Spacewatch || MAS || align=right data-sort-value="0.74" | 740 m || 
|-id=494 bgcolor=#E9E9E9
| 454494 ||  || — || November 10, 2006 || Kitt Peak || Spacewatch || — || align=right | 1.7 km || 
|-id=495 bgcolor=#E9E9E9
| 454495 ||  || — || December 11, 2002 || Socorro || LINEAR || EUN || align=right | 1.2 km || 
|-id=496 bgcolor=#E9E9E9
| 454496 ||  || — || January 15, 2008 || Mount Lemmon || Mount Lemmon Survey || — || align=right | 2.0 km || 
|-id=497 bgcolor=#E9E9E9
| 454497 ||  || — || October 10, 2010 || Kitt Peak || Spacewatch || — || align=right | 1.9 km || 
|-id=498 bgcolor=#E9E9E9
| 454498 ||  || — || December 24, 2006 || Kitt Peak || Spacewatch || — || align=right | 2.1 km || 
|-id=499 bgcolor=#E9E9E9
| 454499 ||  || — || September 28, 2006 || Mount Lemmon || Mount Lemmon Survey || — || align=right | 1.8 km || 
|-id=500 bgcolor=#E9E9E9
| 454500 ||  || — || September 17, 2010 || Mount Lemmon || Mount Lemmon Survey || — || align=right | 1.5 km || 
|}

454501–454600 

|-bgcolor=#fefefe
| 454501 ||  || — || January 7, 2005 || Catalina || CSS || — || align=right data-sort-value="0.78" | 780 m || 
|-id=502 bgcolor=#fefefe
| 454502 ||  || — || October 11, 2007 || Catalina || CSS || — || align=right data-sort-value="0.87" | 870 m || 
|-id=503 bgcolor=#fefefe
| 454503 ||  || — || April 4, 2005 || Mount Lemmon || Mount Lemmon Survey || — || align=right | 1.2 km || 
|-id=504 bgcolor=#d6d6d6
| 454504 ||  || — || April 30, 2008 || Kitt Peak || Spacewatch || — || align=right | 2.4 km || 
|-id=505 bgcolor=#d6d6d6
| 454505 Suntharalingam ||  ||  || January 20, 2010 || WISE || WISE || — || align=right | 2.8 km || 
|-id=506 bgcolor=#fefefe
| 454506 ||  || — || October 13, 2007 || Catalina || CSS || — || align=right | 1.2 km || 
|-id=507 bgcolor=#E9E9E9
| 454507 ||  || — || April 14, 2008 || Mount Lemmon || Mount Lemmon Survey || — || align=right | 2.3 km || 
|-id=508 bgcolor=#d6d6d6
| 454508 ||  || — || December 2, 2005 || Mount Lemmon || Mount Lemmon Survey || — || align=right | 2.4 km || 
|-id=509 bgcolor=#E9E9E9
| 454509 ||  || — || October 31, 2006 || Mount Lemmon || Mount Lemmon Survey || — || align=right | 2.2 km || 
|-id=510 bgcolor=#d6d6d6
| 454510 ||  || — || January 2, 2011 || Mount Lemmon || Mount Lemmon Survey || — || align=right | 2.3 km || 
|-id=511 bgcolor=#d6d6d6
| 454511 ||  || — || January 8, 2010 || WISE || WISE || — || align=right | 2.5 km || 
|-id=512 bgcolor=#fefefe
| 454512 ||  || — || December 22, 2005 || Kitt Peak || Spacewatch || — || align=right data-sort-value="0.59" | 590 m || 
|-id=513 bgcolor=#E9E9E9
| 454513 ||  || — || August 30, 2005 || Kitt Peak || Spacewatch || AGN || align=right | 1.1 km || 
|-id=514 bgcolor=#E9E9E9
| 454514 ||  || — || December 5, 2007 || Mount Lemmon || Mount Lemmon Survey || — || align=right | 1.9 km || 
|-id=515 bgcolor=#d6d6d6
| 454515 ||  || — || November 22, 2000 || Kitt Peak || Spacewatch || — || align=right | 3.1 km || 
|-id=516 bgcolor=#d6d6d6
| 454516 ||  || — || September 23, 2009 || Catalina || CSS || — || align=right | 3.1 km || 
|-id=517 bgcolor=#fefefe
| 454517 ||  || — || February 10, 2010 || Kitt Peak || Spacewatch || — || align=right data-sort-value="0.62" | 620 m || 
|-id=518 bgcolor=#fefefe
| 454518 ||  || — || April 10, 2010 || Kitt Peak || Spacewatch || V || align=right data-sort-value="0.65" | 650 m || 
|-id=519 bgcolor=#E9E9E9
| 454519 ||  || — || February 11, 2008 || Mount Lemmon || Mount Lemmon Survey || — || align=right | 2.3 km || 
|-id=520 bgcolor=#d6d6d6
| 454520 ||  || — || October 28, 2010 || Mount Lemmon || Mount Lemmon Survey || — || align=right | 2.1 km || 
|-id=521 bgcolor=#d6d6d6
| 454521 ||  || — || October 25, 2005 || Kitt Peak || Spacewatch || — || align=right | 2.3 km || 
|-id=522 bgcolor=#d6d6d6
| 454522 ||  || — || June 5, 2013 || Mount Lemmon || Mount Lemmon Survey || — || align=right | 2.6 km || 
|-id=523 bgcolor=#E9E9E9
| 454523 ||  || — || September 26, 2006 || Kitt Peak || Spacewatch || — || align=right | 1.2 km || 
|-id=524 bgcolor=#d6d6d6
| 454524 ||  || — || October 8, 2007 || Mount Lemmon || Mount Lemmon Survey || criticalTj (2.97) || align=right | 2.7 km || 
|-id=525 bgcolor=#fefefe
| 454525 ||  || — || March 14, 2004 || Kitt Peak || Spacewatch || — || align=right data-sort-value="0.48" | 480 m || 
|-id=526 bgcolor=#d6d6d6
| 454526 ||  || — || January 19, 2012 || Kitt Peak || Spacewatch || — || align=right | 2.9 km || 
|-id=527 bgcolor=#d6d6d6
| 454527 ||  || — || December 14, 2010 || Mount Lemmon || Mount Lemmon Survey || — || align=right | 3.0 km || 
|-id=528 bgcolor=#E9E9E9
| 454528 ||  || — || October 30, 2002 || Kitt Peak || Spacewatch || — || align=right | 1.2 km || 
|-id=529 bgcolor=#d6d6d6
| 454529 ||  || — || October 17, 1998 || Kitt Peak || Spacewatch || — || align=right | 3.4 km || 
|-id=530 bgcolor=#d6d6d6
| 454530 ||  || — || August 17, 2009 || Kitt Peak || Spacewatch || — || align=right | 2.5 km || 
|-id=531 bgcolor=#fefefe
| 454531 ||  || — || March 23, 2006 || Mount Lemmon || Mount Lemmon Survey || — || align=right | 1.1 km || 
|-id=532 bgcolor=#d6d6d6
| 454532 ||  || — || January 10, 2011 || Mount Lemmon || Mount Lemmon Survey || — || align=right | 2.9 km || 
|-id=533 bgcolor=#d6d6d6
| 454533 ||  || — || January 22, 2006 || Mount Lemmon || Mount Lemmon Survey || — || align=right | 2.7 km || 
|-id=534 bgcolor=#d6d6d6
| 454534 ||  || — || July 27, 2009 || Kitt Peak || Spacewatch || EOS || align=right | 2.0 km || 
|-id=535 bgcolor=#E9E9E9
| 454535 ||  || — || September 10, 2010 || Kitt Peak || Spacewatch || — || align=right | 1.4 km || 
|-id=536 bgcolor=#d6d6d6
| 454536 ||  || — || March 19, 2007 || Mount Lemmon || Mount Lemmon Survey || — || align=right | 2.7 km || 
|-id=537 bgcolor=#fefefe
| 454537 ||  || — || May 13, 1996 || Kitt Peak || Spacewatch || NYS || align=right data-sort-value="0.65" | 650 m || 
|-id=538 bgcolor=#d6d6d6
| 454538 ||  || — || April 10, 2013 || Mount Lemmon || Mount Lemmon Survey || EOS || align=right | 1.8 km || 
|-id=539 bgcolor=#E9E9E9
| 454539 ||  || — || April 23, 2009 || Mount Lemmon || Mount Lemmon Survey || — || align=right | 2.5 km || 
|-id=540 bgcolor=#fefefe
| 454540 ||  || — || March 31, 2010 || WISE || WISE || — || align=right | 1.3 km || 
|-id=541 bgcolor=#E9E9E9
| 454541 ||  || — || September 20, 2006 || Catalina || CSS || KON || align=right | 2.8 km || 
|-id=542 bgcolor=#E9E9E9
| 454542 ||  || — || January 15, 2004 || Kitt Peak || Spacewatch || — || align=right data-sort-value="0.94" | 940 m || 
|-id=543 bgcolor=#E9E9E9
| 454543 ||  || — || April 1, 2008 || Kitt Peak || Spacewatch || — || align=right | 1.9 km || 
|-id=544 bgcolor=#E9E9E9
| 454544 ||  || — || June 2, 2014 || Mount Lemmon || Mount Lemmon Survey || — || align=right | 2.7 km || 
|-id=545 bgcolor=#E9E9E9
| 454545 ||  || — || September 10, 2010 || Kitt Peak || Spacewatch || — || align=right | 2.0 km || 
|-id=546 bgcolor=#fefefe
| 454546 ||  || — || September 29, 2011 || Mount Lemmon || Mount Lemmon Survey || — || align=right data-sort-value="0.84" | 840 m || 
|-id=547 bgcolor=#d6d6d6
| 454547 ||  || — || January 5, 2006 || Kitt Peak || Spacewatch || — || align=right | 1.9 km || 
|-id=548 bgcolor=#E9E9E9
| 454548 ||  || — || March 26, 2008 || Mount Lemmon || Mount Lemmon Survey || — || align=right | 2.0 km || 
|-id=549 bgcolor=#d6d6d6
| 454549 ||  || — || November 2, 2005 || Mount Lemmon || Mount Lemmon Survey || — || align=right | 2.0 km || 
|-id=550 bgcolor=#E9E9E9
| 454550 ||  || — || August 10, 2010 || Kitt Peak || Spacewatch || — || align=right data-sort-value="0.94" | 940 m || 
|-id=551 bgcolor=#E9E9E9
| 454551 ||  || — || September 16, 2010 || Kitt Peak || Spacewatch || — || align=right | 1.8 km || 
|-id=552 bgcolor=#d6d6d6
| 454552 ||  || — || December 9, 2010 || Kitt Peak || Spacewatch || — || align=right | 3.5 km || 
|-id=553 bgcolor=#E9E9E9
| 454553 ||  || — || October 23, 2006 || Kitt Peak || Spacewatch || — || align=right | 2.1 km || 
|-id=554 bgcolor=#E9E9E9
| 454554 ||  || — || October 17, 2010 || Mount Lemmon || Mount Lemmon Survey || HOF || align=right | 2.4 km || 
|-id=555 bgcolor=#E9E9E9
| 454555 ||  || — || July 6, 2005 || Kitt Peak || Spacewatch || — || align=right | 2.4 km || 
|-id=556 bgcolor=#E9E9E9
| 454556 ||  || — || February 21, 2009 || Kitt Peak || Spacewatch || — || align=right data-sort-value="0.76" | 760 m || 
|-id=557 bgcolor=#d6d6d6
| 454557 ||  || — || November 5, 2010 || Mount Lemmon || Mount Lemmon Survey || — || align=right | 2.6 km || 
|-id=558 bgcolor=#d6d6d6
| 454558 ||  || — || December 25, 2005 || Kitt Peak || Spacewatch || EOS || align=right | 1.6 km || 
|-id=559 bgcolor=#fefefe
| 454559 ||  || — || April 9, 2010 || Catalina || CSS || — || align=right | 1.0 km || 
|-id=560 bgcolor=#E9E9E9
| 454560 ||  || — || April 1, 2013 || Mount Lemmon || Mount Lemmon Survey || — || align=right data-sort-value="0.77" | 770 m || 
|-id=561 bgcolor=#E9E9E9
| 454561 ||  || — || September 15, 2006 || Kitt Peak || Spacewatch || — || align=right data-sort-value="0.86" | 860 m || 
|-id=562 bgcolor=#d6d6d6
| 454562 ||  || — || November 11, 2010 || Mount Lemmon || Mount Lemmon Survey || KOR || align=right | 1.1 km || 
|-id=563 bgcolor=#fefefe
| 454563 ||  || — || March 18, 2002 || Kitt Peak || Spacewatch || MAS || align=right data-sort-value="0.81" | 810 m || 
|-id=564 bgcolor=#E9E9E9
| 454564 ||  || — || June 14, 2010 || WISE || WISE || ADE || align=right | 2.5 km || 
|-id=565 bgcolor=#fefefe
| 454565 ||  || — || October 9, 1999 || Kitt Peak || Spacewatch || — || align=right data-sort-value="0.86" | 860 m || 
|-id=566 bgcolor=#d6d6d6
| 454566 ||  || — || November 7, 2010 || Mount Lemmon || Mount Lemmon Survey || EOS || align=right | 2.0 km || 
|-id=567 bgcolor=#E9E9E9
| 454567 ||  || — || October 31, 2006 || Mount Lemmon || Mount Lemmon Survey || — || align=right | 1.3 km || 
|-id=568 bgcolor=#E9E9E9
| 454568 ||  || — || September 8, 2010 || Kitt Peak || Spacewatch || — || align=right | 1.6 km || 
|-id=569 bgcolor=#d6d6d6
| 454569 ||  || — || November 12, 2010 || Catalina || CSS || — || align=right | 2.6 km || 
|-id=570 bgcolor=#d6d6d6
| 454570 ||  || — || September 22, 2003 || Kitt Peak || Spacewatch || THMcritical || align=right | 1.7 km || 
|-id=571 bgcolor=#fefefe
| 454571 ||  || — || October 19, 2011 || Mount Lemmon || Mount Lemmon Survey || — || align=right data-sort-value="0.72" | 720 m || 
|-id=572 bgcolor=#E9E9E9
| 454572 ||  || — || April 2, 2005 || Kitt Peak || Spacewatch || — || align=right data-sort-value="0.75" | 750 m || 
|-id=573 bgcolor=#fefefe
| 454573 ||  || — || February 27, 2006 || Mount Lemmon || Mount Lemmon Survey || NYS || align=right data-sort-value="0.61" | 610 m || 
|-id=574 bgcolor=#d6d6d6
| 454574 ||  || — || February 1, 2012 || Mount Lemmon || Mount Lemmon Survey || — || align=right | 3.3 km || 
|-id=575 bgcolor=#E9E9E9
| 454575 ||  || — || September 4, 2010 || Kitt Peak || Spacewatch || — || align=right | 1.2 km || 
|-id=576 bgcolor=#d6d6d6
| 454576 ||  || — || September 21, 2009 || Kitt Peak || Spacewatch || — || align=right | 3.6 km || 
|-id=577 bgcolor=#d6d6d6
| 454577 ||  || — || December 10, 2010 || Kitt Peak || Spacewatch || — || align=right | 2.4 km || 
|-id=578 bgcolor=#d6d6d6
| 454578 ||  || — || October 5, 2004 || Kitt Peak || Spacewatch || — || align=right | 2.2 km || 
|-id=579 bgcolor=#fefefe
| 454579 ||  || — || March 25, 2006 || Mount Lemmon || Mount Lemmon Survey || MAS || align=right data-sort-value="0.71" | 710 m || 
|-id=580 bgcolor=#d6d6d6
| 454580 ||  || — || October 29, 2005 || Mount Lemmon || Mount Lemmon Survey || KOR || align=right | 1.3 km || 
|-id=581 bgcolor=#fefefe
| 454581 ||  || — || February 14, 1997 || Xinglong || SCAP || — || align=right | 1.1 km || 
|-id=582 bgcolor=#d6d6d6
| 454582 ||  || — || February 25, 2006 || Kitt Peak || Spacewatch || — || align=right | 3.6 km || 
|-id=583 bgcolor=#d6d6d6
| 454583 ||  || — || January 27, 2006 || Mount Lemmon || Mount Lemmon Survey || — || align=right | 2.9 km || 
|-id=584 bgcolor=#d6d6d6
| 454584 ||  || — || January 4, 2006 || Kitt Peak || Spacewatch || EOS || align=right | 1.7 km || 
|-id=585 bgcolor=#d6d6d6
| 454585 ||  || — || January 21, 2006 || Kitt Peak || Spacewatch || — || align=right | 2.3 km || 
|-id=586 bgcolor=#d6d6d6
| 454586 ||  || — || October 22, 2009 || Mount Lemmon || Mount Lemmon Survey || THM || align=right | 2.0 km || 
|-id=587 bgcolor=#E9E9E9
| 454587 ||  || — || February 28, 2008 || Mount Lemmon || Mount Lemmon Survey || MRX || align=right | 1.0 km || 
|-id=588 bgcolor=#E9E9E9
| 454588 ||  || — || November 1, 2010 || Mount Lemmon || Mount Lemmon Survey || AST || align=right | 1.6 km || 
|-id=589 bgcolor=#d6d6d6
| 454589 ||  || — || September 24, 2009 || Mount Lemmon || Mount Lemmon Survey || — || align=right | 2.3 km || 
|-id=590 bgcolor=#d6d6d6
| 454590 ||  || — || February 25, 2007 || Mount Lemmon || Mount Lemmon Survey || — || align=right | 2.2 km || 
|-id=591 bgcolor=#d6d6d6
| 454591 ||  || — || October 16, 2009 || Catalina || CSS || EOS || align=right | 2.1 km || 
|-id=592 bgcolor=#E9E9E9
| 454592 ||  || — || May 15, 2009 || Kitt Peak || Spacewatch || EUN || align=right | 1.0 km || 
|-id=593 bgcolor=#d6d6d6
| 454593 ||  || — || March 27, 2010 || WISE || WISE || ULA7:4 || align=right | 4.9 km || 
|-id=594 bgcolor=#fefefe
| 454594 ||  || — || September 14, 2007 || Mount Lemmon || Mount Lemmon Survey || — || align=right data-sort-value="0.72" | 720 m || 
|-id=595 bgcolor=#E9E9E9
| 454595 ||  || — || September 2, 2010 || Mount Lemmon || Mount Lemmon Survey || EUN || align=right | 1.2 km || 
|-id=596 bgcolor=#fefefe
| 454596 ||  || — || March 18, 1998 || Kitt Peak || Spacewatch || MAS || align=right data-sort-value="0.77" | 770 m || 
|-id=597 bgcolor=#E9E9E9
| 454597 ||  || — || January 22, 1998 || Kitt Peak || Spacewatch || — || align=right | 2.1 km || 
|-id=598 bgcolor=#E9E9E9
| 454598 ||  || — || July 7, 2010 || WISE || WISE || — || align=right | 2.0 km || 
|-id=599 bgcolor=#d6d6d6
| 454599 ||  || — || November 9, 2007 || Kitt Peak || Spacewatch || SHU3:2 || align=right | 5.8 km || 
|-id=600 bgcolor=#fefefe
| 454600 ||  || — || February 27, 2006 || Kitt Peak || Spacewatch || MAS || align=right data-sort-value="0.63" | 630 m || 
|}

454601–454700 

|-bgcolor=#d6d6d6
| 454601 ||  || — || May 19, 2004 || Kitt Peak || Spacewatch || — || align=right | 2.7 km || 
|-id=602 bgcolor=#d6d6d6
| 454602 ||  || — || October 22, 2009 || Mount Lemmon || Mount Lemmon Survey || — || align=right | 2.1 km || 
|-id=603 bgcolor=#E9E9E9
| 454603 ||  || — || October 14, 2001 || Kitt Peak || Spacewatch ||  || align=right | 2.0 km || 
|-id=604 bgcolor=#d6d6d6
| 454604 ||  || — || December 10, 2004 || Kitt Peak || Spacewatch || — || align=right | 3.6 km || 
|-id=605 bgcolor=#fefefe
| 454605 ||  || — || September 19, 2003 || Kitt Peak || Spacewatch || — || align=right data-sort-value="0.98" | 980 m || 
|-id=606 bgcolor=#d6d6d6
| 454606 ||  || — || November 8, 2009 || Mount Lemmon || Mount Lemmon Survey || — || align=right | 2.6 km || 
|-id=607 bgcolor=#E9E9E9
| 454607 ||  || — || April 5, 2000 || Socorro || LINEAR || — || align=right | 1.5 km || 
|-id=608 bgcolor=#d6d6d6
| 454608 ||  || — || September 22, 2009 || Kitt Peak || Spacewatch || — || align=right | 2.3 km || 
|-id=609 bgcolor=#d6d6d6
| 454609 ||  || — || February 4, 2010 || WISE || WISE || — || align=right | 4.3 km || 
|-id=610 bgcolor=#d6d6d6
| 454610 ||  || — || October 13, 2005 || Kitt Peak || Spacewatch ||  || align=right | 2.1 km || 
|-id=611 bgcolor=#d6d6d6
| 454611 ||  || — || September 26, 2009 || Kitt Peak || Spacewatch || — || align=right | 2.3 km || 
|-id=612 bgcolor=#fefefe
| 454612 ||  || — || September 23, 2011 || Kitt Peak || Spacewatch || — || align=right data-sort-value="0.88" | 880 m || 
|-id=613 bgcolor=#E9E9E9
| 454613 ||  || — || February 13, 2004 || Kitt Peak || Spacewatch || — || align=right | 1.4 km || 
|-id=614 bgcolor=#E9E9E9
| 454614 ||  || — || August 19, 2006 || Kitt Peak || Spacewatch || — || align=right data-sort-value="0.86" | 860 m || 
|-id=615 bgcolor=#d6d6d6
| 454615 ||  || — || October 15, 2004 || Mount Lemmon || Mount Lemmon Survey || — || align=right | 2.1 km || 
|-id=616 bgcolor=#E9E9E9
| 454616 ||  || — || January 20, 2012 || Mount Lemmon || Mount Lemmon Survey || — || align=right | 2.1 km || 
|-id=617 bgcolor=#E9E9E9
| 454617 ||  || — || September 11, 2010 || Mount Lemmon || Mount Lemmon Survey || — || align=right | 1.4 km || 
|-id=618 bgcolor=#d6d6d6
| 454618 ||  || — || August 1, 2003 || Socorro || LINEAR || — || align=right | 4.7 km || 
|-id=619 bgcolor=#d6d6d6
| 454619 ||  || — || September 17, 2009 || Mount Lemmon || Mount Lemmon Survey || EOS || align=right | 1.4 km || 
|-id=620 bgcolor=#E9E9E9
| 454620 ||  || — || July 6, 2005 || Kitt Peak || Spacewatch || — || align=right | 1.3 km || 
|-id=621 bgcolor=#d6d6d6
| 454621 ||  || — || September 4, 2008 || Kitt Peak || Spacewatch || — || align=right | 3.1 km || 
|-id=622 bgcolor=#d6d6d6
| 454622 ||  || — || January 26, 2011 || Mount Lemmon || Mount Lemmon Survey || — || align=right | 2.5 km || 
|-id=623 bgcolor=#d6d6d6
| 454623 ||  || — || September 18, 2009 || Kitt Peak || Spacewatch || — || align=right | 2.4 km || 
|-id=624 bgcolor=#d6d6d6
| 454624 ||  || — || October 7, 2004 || Kitt Peak || Spacewatch || — || align=right | 2.2 km || 
|-id=625 bgcolor=#d6d6d6
| 454625 ||  || — || October 28, 2005 || Kitt Peak || Spacewatch || KOR || align=right | 1.2 km || 
|-id=626 bgcolor=#d6d6d6
| 454626 ||  || — || September 15, 2009 || Kitt Peak || Spacewatch || THM || align=right | 2.0 km || 
|-id=627 bgcolor=#d6d6d6
| 454627 ||  || — || October 22, 2009 || Mount Lemmon || Mount Lemmon Survey || — || align=right | 3.5 km || 
|-id=628 bgcolor=#d6d6d6
| 454628 ||  || — || September 15, 2009 || Kitt Peak || Spacewatch || — || align=right | 2.3 km || 
|-id=629 bgcolor=#d6d6d6
| 454629 ||  || — || June 15, 2013 || Mount Lemmon || Mount Lemmon Survey || — || align=right | 2.9 km || 
|-id=630 bgcolor=#d6d6d6
| 454630 ||  || — || April 25, 2006 || Kitt Peak || Spacewatch || — || align=right | 6.8 km || 
|-id=631 bgcolor=#d6d6d6
| 454631 ||  || — || September 23, 2008 || Kitt Peak || Spacewatch || 7:4 || align=right | 2.6 km || 
|-id=632 bgcolor=#E9E9E9
| 454632 ||  || — || February 10, 2008 || Kitt Peak || Spacewatch || — || align=right | 2.4 km || 
|-id=633 bgcolor=#fefefe
| 454633 ||  || — || September 12, 2007 || Catalina || CSS || — || align=right | 1.0 km || 
|-id=634 bgcolor=#fefefe
| 454634 ||  || — || February 19, 2009 || Mount Lemmon || Mount Lemmon Survey || — || align=right data-sort-value="0.78" | 780 m || 
|-id=635 bgcolor=#d6d6d6
| 454635 ||  || — || March 15, 2012 || Kitt Peak || Spacewatch || — || align=right | 2.9 km || 
|-id=636 bgcolor=#E9E9E9
| 454636 ||  || — || January 15, 2008 || Mount Lemmon || Mount Lemmon Survey || — || align=right data-sort-value="0.92" | 920 m || 
|-id=637 bgcolor=#E9E9E9
| 454637 ||  || — || October 11, 2010 || Mount Lemmon || Mount Lemmon Survey || HOF || align=right | 2.2 km || 
|-id=638 bgcolor=#d6d6d6
| 454638 ||  || — || October 1, 2005 || Mount Lemmon || Mount Lemmon Survey || — || align=right | 2.0 km || 
|-id=639 bgcolor=#fefefe
| 454639 ||  || — || October 20, 2003 || Kitt Peak || Spacewatch || — || align=right | 1.1 km || 
|-id=640 bgcolor=#E9E9E9
| 454640 ||  || — || April 25, 2004 || Kitt Peak || Spacewatch || — || align=right | 1.9 km || 
|-id=641 bgcolor=#d6d6d6
| 454641 ||  || — || September 15, 2009 || Kitt Peak || Spacewatch || VER || align=right | 2.6 km || 
|-id=642 bgcolor=#fefefe
| 454642 ||  || — || June 13, 2004 || Kitt Peak || Spacewatch || — || align=right data-sort-value="0.82" | 820 m || 
|-id=643 bgcolor=#d6d6d6
| 454643 ||  || — || October 17, 2003 || Kitt Peak || Spacewatch || — || align=right | 3.4 km || 
|-id=644 bgcolor=#d6d6d6
| 454644 ||  || — || December 28, 2005 || Kitt Peak || Spacewatch || EOS || align=right | 2.2 km || 
|-id=645 bgcolor=#d6d6d6
| 454645 ||  || — || May 11, 2007 || Mount Lemmon || Mount Lemmon Survey || — || align=right | 3.8 km || 
|-id=646 bgcolor=#d6d6d6
| 454646 ||  || — || January 11, 2011 || Kitt Peak || Spacewatch || — || align=right | 3.4 km || 
|-id=647 bgcolor=#d6d6d6
| 454647 ||  || — || November 9, 2009 || Mount Lemmon || Mount Lemmon Survey || — || align=right | 2.9 km || 
|-id=648 bgcolor=#E9E9E9
| 454648 ||  || — || September 3, 2010 || Mount Lemmon || Mount Lemmon Survey || — || align=right | 1.3 km || 
|-id=649 bgcolor=#d6d6d6
| 454649 ||  || — || September 18, 2003 || Kitt Peak || Spacewatch || EOS || align=right | 1.6 km || 
|-id=650 bgcolor=#E9E9E9
| 454650 ||  || — || October 16, 2006 || Kitt Peak || Spacewatch || — || align=right | 1.9 km || 
|-id=651 bgcolor=#fefefe
| 454651 ||  || — || November 4, 1996 || Kitt Peak || Spacewatch || V || align=right data-sort-value="0.77" | 770 m || 
|-id=652 bgcolor=#E9E9E9
| 454652 ||  || — || November 19, 2006 || Catalina || CSS || — || align=right | 1.5 km || 
|-id=653 bgcolor=#d6d6d6
| 454653 ||  || — || August 4, 2003 || Kitt Peak || Spacewatch || — || align=right | 3.2 km || 
|-id=654 bgcolor=#d6d6d6
| 454654 ||  || — || November 7, 2010 || Mount Lemmon || Mount Lemmon Survey || — || align=right | 3.1 km || 
|-id=655 bgcolor=#d6d6d6
| 454655 ||  || — || January 9, 2006 || Kitt Peak || Spacewatch || EOS || align=right | 1.5 km || 
|-id=656 bgcolor=#d6d6d6
| 454656 ||  || — || September 16, 2003 || Kitt Peak || Spacewatch || — || align=right | 2.1 km || 
|-id=657 bgcolor=#d6d6d6
| 454657 ||  || — || October 11, 1999 || Kitt Peak || Spacewatch || — || align=right | 2.2 km || 
|-id=658 bgcolor=#E9E9E9
| 454658 ||  || — || February 28, 2008 || Mount Lemmon || Mount Lemmon Survey || — || align=right | 1.9 km || 
|-id=659 bgcolor=#d6d6d6
| 454659 ||  || — || December 2, 2005 || Kitt Peak || Spacewatch || — || align=right | 2.4 km || 
|-id=660 bgcolor=#E9E9E9
| 454660 ||  || — || August 18, 2009 || Kitt Peak || Spacewatch || — || align=right | 2.0 km || 
|-id=661 bgcolor=#d6d6d6
| 454661 ||  || — || September 4, 2008 || Kitt Peak || Spacewatch || — || align=right | 3.6 km || 
|-id=662 bgcolor=#d6d6d6
| 454662 ||  || — || September 17, 1998 || Kitt Peak || Spacewatch || — || align=right | 2.4 km || 
|-id=663 bgcolor=#E9E9E9
| 454663 ||  || — || January 2, 2012 || Kitt Peak || Spacewatch || — || align=right | 3.1 km || 
|-id=664 bgcolor=#E9E9E9
| 454664 ||  || — || November 19, 2007 || Mount Lemmon || Mount Lemmon Survey || — || align=right | 3.3 km || 
|-id=665 bgcolor=#E9E9E9
| 454665 ||  || — || October 14, 2010 || Mount Lemmon || Mount Lemmon Survey || AST || align=right | 1.7 km || 
|-id=666 bgcolor=#d6d6d6
| 454666 ||  || — || September 27, 2009 || Mount Lemmon || Mount Lemmon Survey || — || align=right | 3.4 km || 
|-id=667 bgcolor=#E9E9E9
| 454667 ||  || — || March 27, 1995 || Kitt Peak || Spacewatch || — || align=right | 2.0 km || 
|-id=668 bgcolor=#E9E9E9
| 454668 ||  || — || March 29, 2008 || Mount Lemmon || Mount Lemmon Survey || — || align=right | 1.5 km || 
|-id=669 bgcolor=#E9E9E9
| 454669 ||  || — || October 2, 2006 || Mount Lemmon || Mount Lemmon Survey || — || align=right data-sort-value="0.86" | 860 m || 
|-id=670 bgcolor=#d6d6d6
| 454670 ||  || — || March 14, 2007 || Mount Lemmon || Mount Lemmon Survey || — || align=right | 3.3 km || 
|-id=671 bgcolor=#E9E9E9
| 454671 ||  || — || November 20, 2006 || Kitt Peak || Spacewatch || — || align=right | 1.5 km || 
|-id=672 bgcolor=#E9E9E9
| 454672 ||  || — || January 17, 2007 || Kitt Peak || Spacewatch || — || align=right | 2.1 km || 
|-id=673 bgcolor=#fefefe
| 454673 ||  || — || April 15, 1997 || Kitt Peak || Spacewatch || — || align=right | 1.0 km || 
|-id=674 bgcolor=#d6d6d6
| 454674 ||  || — || December 14, 2004 || Kitt Peak || Spacewatch || EOS || align=right | 1.8 km || 
|-id=675 bgcolor=#fefefe
| 454675 ||  || — || March 3, 2005 || Kitt Peak || Spacewatch || — || align=right data-sort-value="0.99" | 990 m || 
|-id=676 bgcolor=#d6d6d6
| 454676 ||  || — || June 4, 2013 || Mount Lemmon || Mount Lemmon Survey || — || align=right | 3.0 km || 
|-id=677 bgcolor=#d6d6d6
| 454677 ||  || — || September 29, 2009 || Mount Lemmon || Mount Lemmon Survey || — || align=right | 2.4 km || 
|-id=678 bgcolor=#d6d6d6
| 454678 ||  || — || February 13, 2010 || WISE || WISE || — || align=right | 2.7 km || 
|-id=679 bgcolor=#E9E9E9
| 454679 ||  || — || September 12, 2005 || Kitt Peak || Spacewatch || AGN || align=right | 1.0 km || 
|-id=680 bgcolor=#d6d6d6
| 454680 ||  || — || May 7, 2002 || Kitt Peak || Spacewatch || — || align=right | 2.9 km || 
|-id=681 bgcolor=#d6d6d6
| 454681 ||  || — || October 29, 2010 || Mount Lemmon || Mount Lemmon Survey || — || align=right | 2.1 km || 
|-id=682 bgcolor=#fefefe
| 454682 ||  || — || October 1, 2003 || Kitt Peak || Spacewatch || V || align=right data-sort-value="0.90" | 900 m || 
|-id=683 bgcolor=#E9E9E9
| 454683 ||  || — || October 1, 2005 || Anderson Mesa || LONEOS || — || align=right | 2.7 km || 
|-id=684 bgcolor=#d6d6d6
| 454684 ||  || — || November 11, 2004 || Kitt Peak || Spacewatch || — || align=right | 3.2 km || 
|-id=685 bgcolor=#E9E9E9
| 454685 ||  || — || August 28, 2005 || Kitt Peak || Spacewatch || — || align=right | 1.8 km || 
|-id=686 bgcolor=#d6d6d6
| 454686 ||  || — || June 1, 1997 || Kitt Peak || Spacewatch || — || align=right | 2.9 km || 
|-id=687 bgcolor=#d6d6d6
| 454687 ||  || — || March 14, 2012 || Catalina || CSS || — || align=right | 4.9 km || 
|-id=688 bgcolor=#d6d6d6
| 454688 ||  || — || January 23, 2006 || Kitt Peak || Spacewatch || EOS || align=right | 1.8 km || 
|-id=689 bgcolor=#E9E9E9
| 454689 ||  || — || March 26, 2004 || Kitt Peak || Spacewatch || — || align=right | 1.6 km || 
|-id=690 bgcolor=#d6d6d6
| 454690 ||  || — || June 20, 2006 || Mount Lemmon || Mount Lemmon Survey || Tj (2.97) || align=right | 3.5 km || 
|-id=691 bgcolor=#E9E9E9
| 454691 ||  || — || March 2, 2008 || Mount Lemmon || Mount Lemmon Survey || — || align=right | 1.6 km || 
|-id=692 bgcolor=#E9E9E9
| 454692 ||  || — || October 6, 2005 || Kitt Peak || Spacewatch || — || align=right | 2.0 km || 
|-id=693 bgcolor=#d6d6d6
| 454693 ||  || — || January 23, 2011 || Mount Lemmon || Mount Lemmon Survey || — || align=right | 2.5 km || 
|-id=694 bgcolor=#d6d6d6
| 454694 ||  || — || May 13, 2007 || Mount Lemmon || Mount Lemmon Survey || — || align=right | 3.4 km || 
|-id=695 bgcolor=#d6d6d6
| 454695 ||  || — || January 13, 2005 || Kitt Peak || Spacewatch || — || align=right | 3.0 km || 
|-id=696 bgcolor=#d6d6d6
| 454696 ||  || — || October 12, 1998 || Kitt Peak || Spacewatch || — || align=right | 2.8 km || 
|-id=697 bgcolor=#d6d6d6
| 454697 ||  || — || March 26, 2007 || Kitt Peak || Spacewatch || — || align=right | 3.3 km || 
|-id=698 bgcolor=#E9E9E9
| 454698 ||  || — || December 10, 2006 || Kitt Peak || Spacewatch ||  || align=right | 1.5 km || 
|-id=699 bgcolor=#d6d6d6
| 454699 ||  || — || May 29, 2008 || Mount Lemmon || Mount Lemmon Survey || — || align=right | 2.9 km || 
|-id=700 bgcolor=#d6d6d6
| 454700 ||  || — || August 19, 2003 || Campo Imperatore || CINEOS || — || align=right | 2.3 km || 
|}

454701–454800 

|-bgcolor=#E9E9E9
| 454701 ||  || — || October 2, 2005 || Mount Lemmon || Mount Lemmon Survey || DOR || align=right | 2.3 km || 
|-id=702 bgcolor=#d6d6d6
| 454702 ||  || — || September 7, 2004 || Kitt Peak || Spacewatch || KOR || align=right | 1.2 km || 
|-id=703 bgcolor=#fefefe
| 454703 ||  || — || March 13, 2005 || Kitt Peak || Spacewatch || — || align=right data-sort-value="0.95" | 950 m || 
|-id=704 bgcolor=#d6d6d6
| 454704 ||  || — || November 19, 2009 || Mount Lemmon || Mount Lemmon Survey || — || align=right | 2.3 km || 
|-id=705 bgcolor=#d6d6d6
| 454705 ||  || — || September 15, 2009 || Kitt Peak || Spacewatch || — || align=right | 2.8 km || 
|-id=706 bgcolor=#d6d6d6
| 454706 ||  || — || September 19, 2003 || Kitt Peak || Spacewatch || THM || align=right | 2.0 km || 
|-id=707 bgcolor=#d6d6d6
| 454707 ||  || — || November 15, 1995 || Kitt Peak || Spacewatch || KOR || align=right | 1.2 km || 
|-id=708 bgcolor=#d6d6d6
| 454708 ||  || — || December 30, 2005 || Kitt Peak || Spacewatch || — || align=right | 2.4 km || 
|-id=709 bgcolor=#d6d6d6
| 454709 ||  || — || December 18, 2004 || Mount Lemmon || Mount Lemmon Survey || THM || align=right | 2.5 km || 
|-id=710 bgcolor=#d6d6d6
| 454710 ||  || — || August 23, 2004 || Kitt Peak || Spacewatch || KOR || align=right | 1.4 km || 
|-id=711 bgcolor=#d6d6d6
| 454711 ||  || — || March 2, 2006 || Kitt Peak || Spacewatch || — || align=right | 2.5 km || 
|-id=712 bgcolor=#d6d6d6
| 454712 ||  || — || September 28, 2003 || Kitt Peak || Spacewatch || — || align=right | 3.0 km || 
|-id=713 bgcolor=#d6d6d6
| 454713 ||  || — || April 15, 2007 || Mount Lemmon || Mount Lemmon Survey || — || align=right | 2.4 km || 
|-id=714 bgcolor=#d6d6d6
| 454714 ||  || — || October 25, 2005 || Mount Lemmon || Mount Lemmon Survey || — || align=right | 2.3 km || 
|-id=715 bgcolor=#d6d6d6
| 454715 ||  || — || September 30, 2003 || Kitt Peak || Spacewatch || — || align=right | 4.8 km || 
|-id=716 bgcolor=#d6d6d6
| 454716 ||  || — || September 16, 2009 || Mount Lemmon || Mount Lemmon Survey || EOS || align=right | 1.7 km || 
|-id=717 bgcolor=#d6d6d6
| 454717 ||  || — || March 30, 2011 || Mount Lemmon || Mount Lemmon Survey || — || align=right | 3.6 km || 
|-id=718 bgcolor=#E9E9E9
| 454718 ||  || — || October 19, 2006 || Catalina || CSS || ADE || align=right | 2.7 km || 
|-id=719 bgcolor=#d6d6d6
| 454719 ||  || — || March 16, 2010 || WISE || WISE || — || align=right | 4.4 km || 
|-id=720 bgcolor=#E9E9E9
| 454720 ||  || — || March 6, 2008 || Mount Lemmon || Mount Lemmon Survey || — || align=right | 1.8 km || 
|-id=721 bgcolor=#d6d6d6
| 454721 ||  || — || October 14, 2009 || Mount Lemmon || Mount Lemmon Survey || — || align=right | 3.0 km || 
|-id=722 bgcolor=#E9E9E9
| 454722 ||  || — || November 16, 2006 || Catalina || CSS || MAR || align=right | 1.4 km || 
|-id=723 bgcolor=#d6d6d6
| 454723 ||  || — || September 7, 2004 || Kitt Peak || Spacewatch || KOR || align=right | 1.0 km || 
|-id=724 bgcolor=#d6d6d6
| 454724 ||  || — || July 1, 2008 || Kitt Peak || Spacewatch || EOS || align=right | 2.8 km || 
|-id=725 bgcolor=#d6d6d6
| 454725 ||  || — || January 14, 2011 || Kitt Peak || Spacewatch || — || align=right | 4.0 km || 
|-id=726 bgcolor=#d6d6d6
| 454726 ||  || — || November 9, 2009 || Mount Lemmon || Mount Lemmon Survey || EOS || align=right | 2.4 km || 
|-id=727 bgcolor=#E9E9E9
| 454727 ||  || — || October 17, 2010 || Mount Lemmon || Mount Lemmon Survey || — || align=right | 2.2 km || 
|-id=728 bgcolor=#d6d6d6
| 454728 ||  || — || October 23, 2003 || Kitt Peak || Spacewatch || — || align=right | 3.4 km || 
|-id=729 bgcolor=#d6d6d6
| 454729 ||  || — || October 5, 2003 || Kitt Peak || Spacewatch || URS || align=right | 2.8 km || 
|-id=730 bgcolor=#d6d6d6
| 454730 ||  || — || April 19, 2007 || Kitt Peak || Spacewatch || — || align=right | 3.3 km || 
|-id=731 bgcolor=#d6d6d6
| 454731 ||  || — || September 20, 2009 || Mount Lemmon || Mount Lemmon Survey || — || align=right | 2.9 km || 
|-id=732 bgcolor=#d6d6d6
| 454732 ||  || — || December 6, 2005 || Kitt Peak || Spacewatch || — || align=right | 3.7 km || 
|-id=733 bgcolor=#d6d6d6
| 454733 ||  || — || October 1, 2003 || Anderson Mesa || LONEOS || — || align=right | 5.8 km || 
|-id=734 bgcolor=#E9E9E9
| 454734 ||  || — || November 28, 2000 || Kitt Peak || Spacewatch || — || align=right | 3.2 km || 
|-id=735 bgcolor=#C2FFFF
| 454735 ||  || — || June 23, 2011 || Kitt Peak || Spacewatch || L5 || align=right | 9.3 km || 
|-id=736 bgcolor=#E9E9E9
| 454736 ||  || — || October 28, 2005 || Mount Lemmon || Mount Lemmon Survey || HOF || align=right | 3.2 km || 
|-id=737 bgcolor=#d6d6d6
| 454737 ||  || — || April 14, 2010 || WISE || WISE || — || align=right | 3.0 km || 
|-id=738 bgcolor=#d6d6d6
| 454738 ||  || — || March 26, 2011 || Mount Lemmon || Mount Lemmon Survey || EOS || align=right | 2.4 km || 
|-id=739 bgcolor=#d6d6d6
| 454739 ||  || — || November 16, 2009 || Kitt Peak || Spacewatch || — || align=right | 2.8 km || 
|-id=740 bgcolor=#d6d6d6
| 454740 ||  || — || April 25, 2006 || Kitt Peak || Spacewatch || — || align=right | 4.0 km || 
|-id=741 bgcolor=#d6d6d6
| 454741 ||  || — || November 27, 2009 || Kitt Peak || Spacewatch || — || align=right | 3.4 km || 
|-id=742 bgcolor=#fefefe
| 454742 ||  || — || October 13, 2010 || Catalina || CSS || — || align=right | 1.7 km || 
|-id=743 bgcolor=#d6d6d6
| 454743 ||  || — || May 14, 2007 || Siding Spring || SSS || BRA || align=right | 2.3 km || 
|-id=744 bgcolor=#C2FFFF
| 454744 ||  || — || April 4, 2008 || Kitt Peak || Spacewatch || L5 || align=right | 8.7 km || 
|-id=745 bgcolor=#d6d6d6
| 454745 ||  || — || March 19, 2001 || Kitt Peak || Spacewatch || — || align=right | 3.4 km || 
|-id=746 bgcolor=#d6d6d6
| 454746 ||  || — || October 22, 2003 || Kitt Peak || Spacewatch || — || align=right | 3.4 km || 
|-id=747 bgcolor=#d6d6d6
| 454747 ||  || — || November 9, 2009 || Mount Lemmon || Mount Lemmon Survey || EOS || align=right | 2.8 km || 
|-id=748 bgcolor=#fefefe
| 454748 ||  || — || November 14, 2007 || Kitt Peak || Spacewatch || — || align=right | 2.5 km || 
|-id=749 bgcolor=#E9E9E9
| 454749 ||  || — || November 26, 2005 || Kitt Peak || Spacewatch || — || align=right | 3.2 km || 
|-id=750 bgcolor=#d6d6d6
| 454750 ||  || — || January 14, 2010 || Kitt Peak || Spacewatch || — || align=right | 4.4 km || 
|-id=751 bgcolor=#d6d6d6
| 454751 ||  || — || November 19, 2009 || Kitt Peak || Spacewatch || — || align=right | 3.6 km || 
|-id=752 bgcolor=#C2FFFF
| 454752 ||  || — || April 11, 2008 || Mount Lemmon || Mount Lemmon Survey || L5 || align=right | 12 km || 
|-id=753 bgcolor=#C2FFFF
| 454753 ||  || — || March 30, 2008 || Kitt Peak || Spacewatch || L5 || align=right | 9.1 km || 
|-id=754 bgcolor=#d6d6d6
| 454754 ||  || — || March 6, 2010 || WISE || WISE || — || align=right | 4.8 km || 
|-id=755 bgcolor=#d6d6d6
| 454755 ||  || — || July 30, 2008 || Mount Lemmon || Mount Lemmon Survey || THM || align=right | 2.3 km || 
|-id=756 bgcolor=#C2FFFF
| 454756 ||  || — || January 26, 2006 || Mount Lemmon || Mount Lemmon Survey || L5 || align=right | 8.1 km || 
|-id=757 bgcolor=#d6d6d6
| 454757 ||  || — || October 2, 2003 || Kitt Peak || Spacewatch || — || align=right | 3.7 km || 
|-id=758 bgcolor=#E9E9E9
| 454758 ||  || — || December 21, 2006 || Kitt Peak || Spacewatch || — || align=right | 1.4 km || 
|-id=759 bgcolor=#d6d6d6
| 454759 ||  || — || June 16, 2007 || Kitt Peak || Spacewatch || — || align=right | 3.6 km || 
|-id=760 bgcolor=#d6d6d6
| 454760 ||  || — || April 18, 2006 || Anderson Mesa || LONEOS || — || align=right | 3.5 km || 
|-id=761 bgcolor=#E9E9E9
| 454761 ||  || — || October 31, 2005 || Mount Lemmon || Mount Lemmon Survey || — || align=right | 2.1 km || 
|-id=762 bgcolor=#d6d6d6
| 454762 ||  || — || March 25, 2006 || Kitt Peak || Spacewatch || — || align=right | 3.0 km || 
|-id=763 bgcolor=#E9E9E9
| 454763 ||  || — || March 29, 2008 || Kitt Peak || Spacewatch || — || align=right | 1.6 km || 
|-id=764 bgcolor=#d6d6d6
| 454764 ||  || — || September 10, 2010 || Kitt Peak || Spacewatch || — || align=right | 4.2 km || 
|-id=765 bgcolor=#d6d6d6
| 454765 ||  || — || November 19, 2003 || Kitt Peak || Spacewatch || — || align=right | 3.5 km || 
|-id=766 bgcolor=#E9E9E9
| 454766 ||  || — || March 18, 2004 || Kitt Peak || Spacewatch || (5) || align=right data-sort-value="0.78" | 780 m || 
|-id=767 bgcolor=#d6d6d6
| 454767 ||  || — || January 31, 2006 || Kitt Peak || Spacewatch || — || align=right | 5.6 km || 
|-id=768 bgcolor=#d6d6d6
| 454768 ||  || — || July 30, 2008 || Mount Lemmon || Mount Lemmon Survey || — || align=right | 5.1 km || 
|-id=769 bgcolor=#E9E9E9
| 454769 ||  || — || August 31, 2005 || Anderson Mesa || LONEOS || — || align=right | 3.0 km || 
|-id=770 bgcolor=#E9E9E9
| 454770 ||  || — || August 13, 2009 || Siding Spring || SSS || — || align=right | 2.1 km || 
|-id=771 bgcolor=#d6d6d6
| 454771 ||  || — || December 1, 1994 || Kitt Peak || Spacewatch || — || align=right | 2.5 km || 
|-id=772 bgcolor=#d6d6d6
| 454772 ||  || — || June 16, 2006 || Kitt Peak || Spacewatch || — || align=right | 3.5 km || 
|-id=773 bgcolor=#d6d6d6
| 454773 ||  || — || November 26, 2009 || Mount Lemmon || Mount Lemmon Survey || — || align=right | 3.6 km || 
|-id=774 bgcolor=#d6d6d6
| 454774 ||  || — || March 5, 2006 || Kitt Peak || Spacewatch || — || align=right | 2.7 km || 
|-id=775 bgcolor=#d6d6d6
| 454775 ||  || — || August 21, 2008 || Kitt Peak || Spacewatch || — || align=right | 4.1 km || 
|-id=776 bgcolor=#d6d6d6
| 454776 ||  || — || January 13, 2005 || Kitt Peak || Spacewatch || — || align=right | 4.0 km || 
|-id=777 bgcolor=#d6d6d6
| 454777 ||  || — || May 25, 2006 || Mount Lemmon || Mount Lemmon Survey || — || align=right | 4.8 km || 
|-id=778 bgcolor=#d6d6d6
| 454778 ||  || — || October 9, 2008 || Mount Lemmon || Mount Lemmon Survey || EOS || align=right | 2.1 km || 
|-id=779 bgcolor=#E9E9E9
| 454779 ||  || — || October 30, 2005 || Catalina || CSS || — || align=right | 3.8 km || 
|-id=780 bgcolor=#d6d6d6
| 454780 ||  || — || March 1, 2010 || WISE || WISE || — || align=right | 4.1 km || 
|-id=781 bgcolor=#C2FFFF
| 454781 ||  || — || April 10, 2010 || WISE || WISE || L5 || align=right | 12 km || 
|-id=782 bgcolor=#d6d6d6
| 454782 ||  || — || November 25, 2009 || Kitt Peak || Spacewatch || — || align=right | 4.2 km || 
|-id=783 bgcolor=#d6d6d6
| 454783 ||  || — || December 19, 2009 || Kitt Peak || Spacewatch || EOS || align=right | 2.1 km || 
|-id=784 bgcolor=#d6d6d6
| 454784 ||  || — || December 17, 2009 || Mount Lemmon || Mount Lemmon Survey || — || align=right | 2.5 km || 
|-id=785 bgcolor=#d6d6d6
| 454785 ||  || — || October 26, 2008 || Mount Lemmon || Mount Lemmon Survey || — || align=right | 3.2 km || 
|-id=786 bgcolor=#E9E9E9
| 454786 ||  || — || September 8, 1996 || Kitt Peak || Spacewatch || — || align=right | 1.7 km || 
|-id=787 bgcolor=#fefefe
| 454787 ||  || — || December 12, 2012 || Mount Lemmon || Mount Lemmon Survey || — || align=right data-sort-value="0.77" | 770 m || 
|-id=788 bgcolor=#fefefe
| 454788 ||  || — || December 30, 2008 || Kitt Peak || Spacewatch || NYS || align=right data-sort-value="0.86" | 860 m || 
|-id=789 bgcolor=#fefefe
| 454789 ||  || — || September 14, 2005 || Catalina || CSS || — || align=right data-sort-value="0.94" | 940 m || 
|-id=790 bgcolor=#fefefe
| 454790 ||  || — || July 30, 2008 || Mount Lemmon || Mount Lemmon Survey || — || align=right | 1.1 km || 
|-id=791 bgcolor=#fefefe
| 454791 ||  || — || December 5, 2008 || Mount Lemmon || Mount Lemmon Survey || V || align=right data-sort-value="0.72" | 720 m || 
|-id=792 bgcolor=#d6d6d6
| 454792 ||  || — || June 8, 2010 || WISE || WISE || — || align=right | 2.3 km || 
|-id=793 bgcolor=#d6d6d6
| 454793 ||  || — || October 24, 1995 || Kitt Peak || Spacewatch || — || align=right | 2.2 km || 
|-id=794 bgcolor=#E9E9E9
| 454794 ||  || — || October 11, 2006 || Kitt Peak || Spacewatch || GEF || align=right data-sort-value="0.93" | 930 m || 
|-id=795 bgcolor=#fefefe
| 454795 ||  || — || March 10, 2011 || Kitt Peak || Spacewatch || — || align=right data-sort-value="0.69" | 690 m || 
|-id=796 bgcolor=#fefefe
| 454796 ||  || — || April 4, 2003 || Kitt Peak || Spacewatch || — || align=right data-sort-value="0.92" | 920 m || 
|-id=797 bgcolor=#d6d6d6
| 454797 ||  || — || October 31, 2006 || Mount Lemmon || Mount Lemmon Survey || KOR || align=right | 1.4 km || 
|-id=798 bgcolor=#E9E9E9
| 454798 ||  || — || April 23, 2010 || WISE || WISE || DOR || align=right | 2.4 km || 
|-id=799 bgcolor=#E9E9E9
| 454799 ||  || — || September 5, 2010 || Mount Lemmon || Mount Lemmon Survey || — || align=right | 2.3 km || 
|-id=800 bgcolor=#fefefe
| 454800 ||  || — || April 12, 2010 || Mount Lemmon || Mount Lemmon Survey || — || align=right | 1.0 km || 
|}

454801–454900 

|-bgcolor=#E9E9E9
| 454801 ||  || — || October 29, 2006 || Mount Lemmon || Mount Lemmon Survey || — || align=right | 2.7 km || 
|-id=802 bgcolor=#E9E9E9
| 454802 ||  || — || January 5, 2003 || Socorro || LINEAR || — || align=right | 2.9 km || 
|-id=803 bgcolor=#d6d6d6
| 454803 ||  || — || November 18, 2006 || Kitt Peak || Spacewatch || KOR || align=right | 1.5 km || 
|-id=804 bgcolor=#fefefe
| 454804 ||  || — || October 15, 2004 || Kitt Peak || Spacewatch || NYS || align=right data-sort-value="0.66" | 660 m || 
|-id=805 bgcolor=#E9E9E9
| 454805 ||  || — || October 2, 2003 || Kitt Peak || Spacewatch || — || align=right data-sort-value="0.62" | 620 m || 
|-id=806 bgcolor=#d6d6d6
| 454806 ||  || — || September 15, 2004 || Kitt Peak || Spacewatch || — || align=right | 2.4 km || 
|-id=807 bgcolor=#d6d6d6
| 454807 ||  || — || January 30, 2006 || Kitt Peak || Spacewatch || — || align=right | 2.8 km || 
|-id=808 bgcolor=#fefefe
| 454808 ||  || — || October 30, 2005 || Mount Lemmon || Mount Lemmon Survey || — || align=right data-sort-value="0.72" | 720 m || 
|-id=809 bgcolor=#E9E9E9
| 454809 ||  || — || October 20, 2007 || Kitt Peak || Spacewatch || — || align=right data-sort-value="0.75" | 750 m || 
|-id=810 bgcolor=#d6d6d6
| 454810 ||  || — || December 7, 2004 || Socorro || LINEAR || THB || align=right | 3.0 km || 
|-id=811 bgcolor=#E9E9E9
| 454811 ||  || — || November 20, 2003 || Kitt Peak || Spacewatch || — || align=right | 1.5 km || 
|-id=812 bgcolor=#d6d6d6
| 454812 ||  || — || September 26, 2005 || Kitt Peak || Spacewatch || — || align=right | 2.8 km || 
|-id=813 bgcolor=#fefefe
| 454813 ||  || — || October 9, 2004 || Kitt Peak || Spacewatch || — || align=right data-sort-value="0.80" | 800 m || 
|-id=814 bgcolor=#d6d6d6
| 454814 ||  || — || November 11, 2010 || Catalina || CSS || VER || align=right | 3.5 km || 
|-id=815 bgcolor=#fefefe
| 454815 ||  || — || September 26, 2000 || Anderson Mesa || LONEOS || — || align=right data-sort-value="0.98" | 980 m || 
|-id=816 bgcolor=#fefefe
| 454816 ||  || — || November 1, 2000 || Kitt Peak || Spacewatch || MAS || align=right data-sort-value="0.81" | 810 m || 
|-id=817 bgcolor=#fefefe
| 454817 ||  || — || December 30, 2008 || Mount Lemmon || Mount Lemmon Survey || — || align=right data-sort-value="0.78" | 780 m || 
|-id=818 bgcolor=#E9E9E9
| 454818 ||  || — || November 1, 2007 || Kitt Peak || Spacewatch || (5) || align=right data-sort-value="0.80" | 800 m || 
|-id=819 bgcolor=#fefefe
| 454819 ||  || — || December 22, 2008 || Kitt Peak || Spacewatch || — || align=right data-sort-value="0.75" | 750 m || 
|-id=820 bgcolor=#d6d6d6
| 454820 ||  || — || September 11, 2004 || Kitt Peak || Spacewatch || — || align=right | 2.2 km || 
|-id=821 bgcolor=#d6d6d6
| 454821 ||  || — || October 24, 2005 || Kitt Peak || Spacewatch || — || align=right | 3.0 km || 
|-id=822 bgcolor=#d6d6d6
| 454822 ||  || — || April 29, 2008 || Kitt Peak || Spacewatch || — || align=right | 2.8 km || 
|-id=823 bgcolor=#d6d6d6
| 454823 ||  || — || January 29, 1995 || Kitt Peak || Spacewatch || — || align=right | 3.7 km || 
|-id=824 bgcolor=#d6d6d6
| 454824 ||  || — || November 6, 2010 || Mount Lemmon || Mount Lemmon Survey || VER || align=right | 3.6 km || 
|-id=825 bgcolor=#fefefe
| 454825 ||  || — || September 12, 2001 || Socorro || LINEAR || — || align=right | 1.0 km || 
|-id=826 bgcolor=#d6d6d6
| 454826 ||  || — || February 7, 2008 || Kitt Peak || Spacewatch || — || align=right | 2.2 km || 
|-id=827 bgcolor=#E9E9E9
| 454827 ||  || — || June 11, 2005 || Kitt Peak || Spacewatch || MRX || align=right | 1.1 km || 
|-id=828 bgcolor=#fefefe
| 454828 ||  || — || February 20, 2006 || Kitt Peak || Spacewatch || MAS || align=right data-sort-value="0.88" | 880 m || 
|-id=829 bgcolor=#fefefe
| 454829 ||  || — || June 26, 2011 || Mount Lemmon || Mount Lemmon Survey || — || align=right data-sort-value="0.82" | 820 m || 
|-id=830 bgcolor=#E9E9E9
| 454830 ||  || — || April 13, 2004 || Kitt Peak || Spacewatch || HOF || align=right | 2.6 km || 
|-id=831 bgcolor=#E9E9E9
| 454831 ||  || — || December 18, 2007 || Mount Lemmon || Mount Lemmon Survey || — || align=right | 2.3 km || 
|-id=832 bgcolor=#d6d6d6
| 454832 ||  || — || March 31, 2008 || Kitt Peak || Spacewatch || — || align=right | 2.9 km || 
|-id=833 bgcolor=#d6d6d6
| 454833 ||  || — || December 12, 2006 || Kitt Peak || Spacewatch || KOR || align=right | 1.4 km || 
|-id=834 bgcolor=#d6d6d6
| 454834 ||  || — || December 27, 2006 || Mount Lemmon || Mount Lemmon Survey || KOR || align=right | 1.3 km || 
|-id=835 bgcolor=#E9E9E9
| 454835 ||  || — || March 18, 2010 || Mount Lemmon || Mount Lemmon Survey || — || align=right | 1.2 km || 
|-id=836 bgcolor=#d6d6d6
| 454836 ||  || — || September 6, 2004 || Siding Spring || SSS || — || align=right | 3.7 km || 
|-id=837 bgcolor=#d6d6d6
| 454837 ||  || — || October 11, 1993 || Kitt Peak || Spacewatch || — || align=right | 2.7 km || 
|-id=838 bgcolor=#d6d6d6
| 454838 ||  || — || April 2, 2013 || Mount Lemmon || Mount Lemmon Survey || — || align=right | 2.7 km || 
|-id=839 bgcolor=#E9E9E9
| 454839 ||  || — || March 4, 2005 || Kitt Peak || Spacewatch || — || align=right data-sort-value="0.94" | 940 m || 
|-id=840 bgcolor=#d6d6d6
| 454840 ||  || — || March 15, 2007 || Mount Lemmon || Mount Lemmon Survey || — || align=right | 2.8 km || 
|-id=841 bgcolor=#E9E9E9
| 454841 ||  || — || April 26, 2006 || Kitt Peak || Spacewatch || — || align=right data-sort-value="0.98" | 980 m || 
|-id=842 bgcolor=#E9E9E9
| 454842 ||  || — || November 23, 2006 || Kitt Peak || Spacewatch || AST || align=right | 2.5 km || 
|-id=843 bgcolor=#fefefe
| 454843 ||  || — || September 24, 2000 || Socorro || LINEAR || (5026) || align=right data-sort-value="0.79" | 790 m || 
|-id=844 bgcolor=#d6d6d6
| 454844 ||  || — || November 6, 2005 || Kitt Peak || Spacewatch || — || align=right | 2.4 km || 
|-id=845 bgcolor=#fefefe
| 454845 ||  || — || October 31, 2005 || Catalina || CSS || — || align=right data-sort-value="0.72" | 720 m || 
|-id=846 bgcolor=#d6d6d6
| 454846 ||  || — || September 24, 2009 || Kitt Peak || Spacewatch || — || align=right | 3.4 km || 
|-id=847 bgcolor=#d6d6d6
| 454847 ||  || — || January 26, 2006 || Mount Lemmon || Mount Lemmon Survey || — || align=right | 2.6 km || 
|-id=848 bgcolor=#d6d6d6
| 454848 ||  || — || September 18, 2003 || Kitt Peak || Spacewatch || Tj (2.99) || align=right | 3.1 km || 
|-id=849 bgcolor=#E9E9E9
| 454849 ||  || — || May 9, 2005 || Kitt Peak || Spacewatch || — || align=right | 2.2 km || 
|-id=850 bgcolor=#E9E9E9
| 454850 ||  || — || March 14, 2013 || Kitt Peak || Spacewatch || — || align=right | 1.6 km || 
|-id=851 bgcolor=#d6d6d6
| 454851 ||  || — || October 27, 2005 || Catalina || CSS || — || align=right | 2.9 km || 
|-id=852 bgcolor=#fefefe
| 454852 ||  || — || November 2, 2000 || Socorro || LINEAR || — || align=right data-sort-value="0.90" | 900 m || 
|-id=853 bgcolor=#d6d6d6
| 454853 ||  || — || February 27, 2012 || Kitt Peak || Spacewatch || Tj (2.99) || align=right | 3.3 km || 
|-id=854 bgcolor=#d6d6d6
| 454854 ||  || — || October 17, 2010 || Catalina || CSS || — || align=right | 3.0 km || 
|-id=855 bgcolor=#E9E9E9
| 454855 ||  || — || March 26, 2009 || Kitt Peak || Spacewatch || EUN || align=right | 1.3 km || 
|-id=856 bgcolor=#fefefe
| 454856 ||  || — || January 14, 2011 || Kitt Peak || Spacewatch || H || align=right data-sort-value="0.57" | 570 m || 
|-id=857 bgcolor=#d6d6d6
| 454857 ||  || — || October 24, 2005 || Kitt Peak || Spacewatch || — || align=right | 2.4 km || 
|-id=858 bgcolor=#E9E9E9
| 454858 ||  || — || August 6, 2010 || WISE || WISE || — || align=right | 2.7 km || 
|-id=859 bgcolor=#d6d6d6
| 454859 ||  || — || March 19, 2009 || Kitt Peak || Spacewatch || BRA || align=right | 1.4 km || 
|-id=860 bgcolor=#fefefe
| 454860 ||  || — || November 20, 2008 || Mount Lemmon || Mount Lemmon Survey || (5026) || align=right | 1.0 km || 
|-id=861 bgcolor=#fefefe
| 454861 ||  || — || October 23, 2004 || Kitt Peak || Spacewatch || — || align=right data-sort-value="0.82" | 820 m || 
|-id=862 bgcolor=#E9E9E9
| 454862 ||  || — || October 3, 2006 || Mount Lemmon || Mount Lemmon Survey || — || align=right | 2.2 km || 
|-id=863 bgcolor=#fefefe
| 454863 ||  || — || October 8, 2008 || Mount Lemmon || Mount Lemmon Survey || — || align=right data-sort-value="0.86" | 860 m || 
|-id=864 bgcolor=#d6d6d6
| 454864 ||  || — || December 13, 2004 || Campo Imperatore || CINEOS || — || align=right | 3.9 km || 
|-id=865 bgcolor=#d6d6d6
| 454865 ||  || — || October 8, 2004 || Kitt Peak || Spacewatch || VER || align=right | 2.6 km || 
|-id=866 bgcolor=#d6d6d6
| 454866 ||  || — || July 23, 2010 || WISE || WISE || — || align=right | 2.7 km || 
|-id=867 bgcolor=#fefefe
| 454867 ||  || — || September 28, 2000 || Kitt Peak || Spacewatch || — || align=right data-sort-value="0.90" | 900 m || 
|-id=868 bgcolor=#fefefe
| 454868 ||  || — || December 2, 2005 || Kitt Peak || Spacewatch || — || align=right data-sort-value="0.79" | 790 m || 
|-id=869 bgcolor=#fefefe
| 454869 ||  || — || March 14, 2010 || Mount Lemmon || Mount Lemmon Survey || NYS || align=right data-sort-value="0.67" | 670 m || 
|-id=870 bgcolor=#fefefe
| 454870 ||  || — || May 10, 2002 || Kitt Peak || Spacewatch || — || align=right data-sort-value="0.64" | 640 m || 
|-id=871 bgcolor=#d6d6d6
| 454871 ||  || — || October 3, 2010 || Catalina || CSS || — || align=right | 3.0 km || 
|-id=872 bgcolor=#d6d6d6
| 454872 ||  || — || October 9, 2004 || Kitt Peak || Spacewatch || — || align=right | 3.6 km || 
|-id=873 bgcolor=#d6d6d6
| 454873 ||  || — || October 26, 2005 || Kitt Peak || Spacewatch || — || align=right | 2.4 km || 
|-id=874 bgcolor=#d6d6d6
| 454874 ||  || — || August 17, 2009 || Catalina || CSS || — || align=right | 3.4 km || 
|-id=875 bgcolor=#d6d6d6
| 454875 ||  || — || November 1, 2005 || Mount Lemmon || Mount Lemmon Survey || EOS || align=right | 1.8 km || 
|-id=876 bgcolor=#fefefe
| 454876 ||  || — || March 12, 2007 || Kitt Peak || Spacewatch || — || align=right data-sort-value="0.67" | 670 m || 
|-id=877 bgcolor=#fefefe
| 454877 ||  || — || November 18, 2001 || Kitt Peak || Spacewatch || — || align=right data-sort-value="0.65" | 650 m || 
|-id=878 bgcolor=#E9E9E9
| 454878 ||  || — || September 16, 2010 || Kitt Peak || Spacewatch || DOR || align=right | 2.2 km || 
|-id=879 bgcolor=#E9E9E9
| 454879 ||  || — || October 13, 2006 || Kitt Peak || Spacewatch || — || align=right | 2.4 km || 
|-id=880 bgcolor=#d6d6d6
| 454880 ||  || — || September 22, 2009 || Catalina || CSS || — || align=right | 4.2 km || 
|-id=881 bgcolor=#fefefe
| 454881 ||  || — || December 11, 2004 || Kitt Peak || Spacewatch || MAS || align=right data-sort-value="0.71" | 710 m || 
|-id=882 bgcolor=#d6d6d6
| 454882 ||  || — || November 11, 1999 || Kitt Peak || Spacewatch || — || align=right | 2.9 km || 
|-id=883 bgcolor=#E9E9E9
| 454883 ||  || — || September 25, 2006 || Kitt Peak || Spacewatch || — || align=right | 1.9 km || 
|-id=884 bgcolor=#d6d6d6
| 454884 ||  || — || March 12, 2007 || Kitt Peak || Spacewatch || — || align=right | 2.4 km || 
|-id=885 bgcolor=#fefefe
| 454885 ||  || — || October 6, 2004 || Kitt Peak || Spacewatch || — || align=right data-sort-value="0.61" | 610 m || 
|-id=886 bgcolor=#d6d6d6
| 454886 ||  || — || December 21, 2005 || Catalina || CSS || — || align=right | 3.0 km || 
|-id=887 bgcolor=#d6d6d6
| 454887 ||  || — || October 29, 2010 || Kitt Peak || Spacewatch || EOS || align=right | 1.6 km || 
|-id=888 bgcolor=#fefefe
| 454888 ||  || — || December 18, 2004 || Mount Lemmon || Mount Lemmon Survey || CLA || align=right | 1.6 km || 
|-id=889 bgcolor=#E9E9E9
| 454889 ||  || — || October 14, 1998 || Caussols || ODAS || — || align=right | 1.1 km || 
|-id=890 bgcolor=#d6d6d6
| 454890 ||  || — || February 25, 2010 || WISE || WISE || 7:4 || align=right | 3.5 km || 
|-id=891 bgcolor=#E9E9E9
| 454891 ||  || — || April 21, 2009 || Kitt Peak || Spacewatch || KON || align=right | 2.5 km || 
|-id=892 bgcolor=#E9E9E9
| 454892 ||  || — || April 21, 2009 || Mount Lemmon || Mount Lemmon Survey || EUN || align=right data-sort-value="0.86" | 860 m || 
|-id=893 bgcolor=#fefefe
| 454893 ||  || — || October 10, 2004 || Kitt Peak || Spacewatch || — || align=right data-sort-value="0.61" | 610 m || 
|-id=894 bgcolor=#E9E9E9
| 454894 ||  || — || October 13, 2006 || Kitt Peak || Spacewatch || WIT || align=right | 1.2 km || 
|-id=895 bgcolor=#d6d6d6
| 454895 ||  || — || October 2, 1999 || Kitt Peak || Spacewatch || EOS || align=right | 2.0 km || 
|-id=896 bgcolor=#d6d6d6
| 454896 ||  || — || December 31, 1999 || Kitt Peak || Spacewatch || EOS || align=right | 2.1 km || 
|-id=897 bgcolor=#E9E9E9
| 454897 ||  || — || September 26, 2006 || Mount Lemmon || Mount Lemmon Survey || — || align=right | 1.3 km || 
|-id=898 bgcolor=#d6d6d6
| 454898 ||  || — || November 9, 1999 || Kitt Peak || Spacewatch || — || align=right | 2.6 km || 
|-id=899 bgcolor=#d6d6d6
| 454899 ||  || — || October 7, 2004 || Kitt Peak || Spacewatch || EOS || align=right | 2.0 km || 
|-id=900 bgcolor=#E9E9E9
| 454900 ||  || — || October 16, 2006 || Catalina || CSS || — || align=right | 2.0 km || 
|}

454901–455000 

|-bgcolor=#d6d6d6
| 454901 ||  || — || January 30, 2011 || Mount Lemmon || Mount Lemmon Survey || 7:4 || align=right | 3.7 km || 
|-id=902 bgcolor=#E9E9E9
| 454902 ||  || — || October 22, 2006 || Catalina || CSS || — || align=right | 1.9 km || 
|-id=903 bgcolor=#fefefe
| 454903 ||  || — || November 17, 2004 || Siding Spring || SSS || H || align=right data-sort-value="0.87" | 870 m || 
|-id=904 bgcolor=#d6d6d6
| 454904 ||  || — || December 14, 2004 || Campo Imperatore || CINEOS || — || align=right | 3.3 km || 
|-id=905 bgcolor=#d6d6d6
| 454905 ||  || — || November 20, 2004 || Kitt Peak || Spacewatch || — || align=right | 3.8 km || 
|-id=906 bgcolor=#E9E9E9
| 454906 ||  || — || February 29, 2008 || Mount Lemmon || Mount Lemmon Survey || — || align=right | 2.2 km || 
|-id=907 bgcolor=#E9E9E9
| 454907 ||  || — || August 28, 2005 || Kitt Peak || Spacewatch || — || align=right | 2.4 km || 
|-id=908 bgcolor=#E9E9E9
| 454908 ||  || — || July 29, 1998 || Caussols || ODAS || (5) || align=right | 3.3 km || 
|-id=909 bgcolor=#E9E9E9
| 454909 ||  || — || November 30, 2011 || Kitt Peak || Spacewatch || — || align=right | 1.8 km || 
|-id=910 bgcolor=#d6d6d6
| 454910 ||  || — || November 6, 2005 || Mount Lemmon || Mount Lemmon Survey || — || align=right | 2.7 km || 
|-id=911 bgcolor=#E9E9E9
| 454911 ||  || — || March 31, 2008 || Kitt Peak || Spacewatch || — || align=right | 2.0 km || 
|-id=912 bgcolor=#d6d6d6
| 454912 ||  || — || February 27, 2006 || Mount Lemmon || Mount Lemmon Survey || — || align=right | 2.9 km || 
|-id=913 bgcolor=#d6d6d6
| 454913 ||  || — || January 9, 2006 || Kitt Peak || Spacewatch || — || align=right | 2.3 km || 
|-id=914 bgcolor=#E9E9E9
| 454914 ||  || — || March 12, 1996 || Kitt Peak || Spacewatch || — || align=right | 2.3 km || 
|-id=915 bgcolor=#d6d6d6
| 454915 ||  || — || May 14, 2004 || Kitt Peak || Spacewatch || 615 || align=right | 1.9 km || 
|-id=916 bgcolor=#E9E9E9
| 454916 ||  || — || July 21, 2006 || Mount Lemmon || Mount Lemmon Survey || EUN || align=right | 1.1 km || 
|-id=917 bgcolor=#d6d6d6
| 454917 ||  || — || December 25, 2010 || Mount Lemmon || Mount Lemmon Survey || — || align=right | 4.0 km || 
|-id=918 bgcolor=#d6d6d6
| 454918 ||  || — || December 2, 2010 || Kitt Peak || Spacewatch || — || align=right | 2.8 km || 
|-id=919 bgcolor=#d6d6d6
| 454919 ||  || — || October 13, 2004 || Kitt Peak || Spacewatch || — || align=right | 3.6 km || 
|-id=920 bgcolor=#E9E9E9
| 454920 ||  || — || May 7, 2006 || Kitt Peak || Spacewatch || — || align=right | 1.1 km || 
|-id=921 bgcolor=#E9E9E9
| 454921 ||  || — || October 17, 2006 || Mount Lemmon || Mount Lemmon Survey || — || align=right | 2.5 km || 
|-id=922 bgcolor=#E9E9E9
| 454922 ||  || — || August 28, 2006 || Kitt Peak || Spacewatch || — || align=right | 1.2 km || 
|-id=923 bgcolor=#d6d6d6
| 454923 ||  || — || March 10, 2007 || Kitt Peak || Spacewatch || — || align=right | 3.5 km || 
|-id=924 bgcolor=#fefefe
| 454924 ||  || — || September 14, 2005 || Kitt Peak || Spacewatch || — || align=right data-sort-value="0.93" | 930 m || 
|-id=925 bgcolor=#fefefe
| 454925 ||  || — || September 4, 2008 || Kitt Peak || Spacewatch || V || align=right data-sort-value="0.58" | 580 m || 
|-id=926 bgcolor=#E9E9E9
| 454926 ||  || — || September 28, 2011 || Mount Lemmon || Mount Lemmon Survey || — || align=right | 1.3 km || 
|-id=927 bgcolor=#d6d6d6
| 454927 ||  || — || August 29, 2005 || Kitt Peak || Spacewatch || — || align=right | 1.9 km || 
|-id=928 bgcolor=#d6d6d6
| 454928 ||  || — || February 21, 2007 || Mount Lemmon || Mount Lemmon Survey || — || align=right | 2.6 km || 
|-id=929 bgcolor=#fefefe
| 454929 ||  || — || October 21, 2008 || Mount Lemmon || Mount Lemmon Survey || — || align=right data-sort-value="0.99" | 990 m || 
|-id=930 bgcolor=#E9E9E9
| 454930 ||  || — || April 18, 2009 || Kitt Peak || Spacewatch || — || align=right | 1.5 km || 
|-id=931 bgcolor=#fefefe
| 454931 ||  || — || February 19, 2010 || WISE || WISE || — || align=right | 2.3 km || 
|-id=932 bgcolor=#fefefe
| 454932 ||  || — || April 2, 2005 || Mount Lemmon || Mount Lemmon Survey || — || align=right data-sort-value="0.49" | 490 m || 
|-id=933 bgcolor=#E9E9E9
| 454933 ||  || — || June 15, 2010 || Mount Lemmon || Mount Lemmon Survey || — || align=right | 1.3 km || 
|-id=934 bgcolor=#fefefe
| 454934 ||  || — || April 15, 2007 || Catalina || CSS || — || align=right data-sort-value="0.99" | 990 m || 
|-id=935 bgcolor=#E9E9E9
| 454935 ||  || — || December 15, 2001 || Socorro || LINEAR || — || align=right | 2.5 km || 
|-id=936 bgcolor=#fefefe
| 454936 ||  || — || April 9, 2010 || Mount Lemmon || Mount Lemmon Survey || — || align=right data-sort-value="0.76" | 760 m || 
|-id=937 bgcolor=#E9E9E9
| 454937 ||  || — || November 17, 2011 || Kitt Peak || Spacewatch || — || align=right | 1.9 km || 
|-id=938 bgcolor=#fefefe
| 454938 ||  || — || August 21, 2008 || Kitt Peak || Spacewatch || — || align=right data-sort-value="0.66" | 660 m || 
|-id=939 bgcolor=#E9E9E9
| 454939 ||  || — || November 20, 2007 || Mount Lemmon || Mount Lemmon Survey || MAR || align=right data-sort-value="0.96" | 960 m || 
|-id=940 bgcolor=#d6d6d6
| 454940 ||  || — || December 11, 2004 || Kitt Peak || Spacewatch || — || align=right | 2.1 km || 
|-id=941 bgcolor=#fefefe
| 454941 ||  || — || October 23, 1997 || Kitt Peak || Spacewatch || — || align=right data-sort-value="0.63" | 630 m || 
|-id=942 bgcolor=#d6d6d6
| 454942 ||  || — || December 31, 1999 || Kitt Peak || Spacewatch || — || align=right | 3.0 km || 
|-id=943 bgcolor=#d6d6d6
| 454943 ||  || — || October 8, 2010 || Kitt Peak || Spacewatch || — || align=right | 4.6 km || 
|-id=944 bgcolor=#d6d6d6
| 454944 ||  || — || October 31, 2010 || Kitt Peak || Spacewatch || — || align=right | 2.6 km || 
|-id=945 bgcolor=#fefefe
| 454945 ||  || — || November 1, 2008 || Mount Lemmon || Mount Lemmon Survey || — || align=right data-sort-value="0.78" | 780 m || 
|-id=946 bgcolor=#fefefe
| 454946 ||  || — || September 23, 2008 || Mount Lemmon || Mount Lemmon Survey || MAS || align=right data-sort-value="0.59" | 590 m || 
|-id=947 bgcolor=#E9E9E9
| 454947 ||  || — || September 17, 1998 || Caussols || ODAS || — || align=right | 1.5 km || 
|-id=948 bgcolor=#fefefe
| 454948 ||  || — || August 29, 2011 || Siding Spring || SSS || — || align=right data-sort-value="0.93" | 930 m || 
|-id=949 bgcolor=#d6d6d6
| 454949 ||  || — || March 29, 2008 || Kitt Peak || Spacewatch || — || align=right | 3.4 km || 
|-id=950 bgcolor=#E9E9E9
| 454950 ||  || — || September 14, 2007 || Mount Lemmon || Mount Lemmon Survey || KON || align=right | 1.8 km || 
|-id=951 bgcolor=#d6d6d6
| 454951 ||  || — || April 29, 2008 || Kitt Peak || Spacewatch || — || align=right | 3.0 km || 
|-id=952 bgcolor=#E9E9E9
| 454952 ||  || — || November 17, 2011 || Mount Lemmon || Mount Lemmon Survey || — || align=right | 1.5 km || 
|-id=953 bgcolor=#d6d6d6
| 454953 ||  || — || December 25, 2005 || Kitt Peak || Spacewatch || — || align=right | 2.1 km || 
|-id=954 bgcolor=#fefefe
| 454954 ||  || — || December 5, 2005 || Kitt Peak || Spacewatch || — || align=right | 1.0 km || 
|-id=955 bgcolor=#E9E9E9
| 454955 ||  || — || September 28, 2006 || Mount Lemmon || Mount Lemmon Survey || — || align=right | 1.9 km || 
|-id=956 bgcolor=#d6d6d6
| 454956 ||  || — || October 30, 2010 || Mount Lemmon || Mount Lemmon Survey || — || align=right | 2.8 km || 
|-id=957 bgcolor=#d6d6d6
| 454957 ||  || — || April 6, 2008 || Kitt Peak || Spacewatch || — || align=right | 2.3 km || 
|-id=958 bgcolor=#FA8072
| 454958 ||  || — || October 7, 1996 || Kitt Peak || Spacewatch || — || align=right data-sort-value="0.57" | 570 m || 
|-id=959 bgcolor=#d6d6d6
| 454959 ||  || — || October 8, 2004 || Kitt Peak || Spacewatch || — || align=right | 3.9 km || 
|-id=960 bgcolor=#fefefe
| 454960 ||  || — || November 20, 2008 || Kitt Peak || Spacewatch || MAS || align=right data-sort-value="0.82" | 820 m || 
|-id=961 bgcolor=#fefefe
| 454961 ||  || — || July 10, 2007 || Siding Spring || SSS || — || align=right | 2.4 km || 
|-id=962 bgcolor=#d6d6d6
| 454962 ||  || — || October 10, 2004 || Socorro || LINEAR || — || align=right | 3.5 km || 
|-id=963 bgcolor=#fefefe
| 454963 ||  || — || September 17, 2004 || Socorro || LINEAR || NYS || align=right data-sort-value="0.87" | 870 m || 
|-id=964 bgcolor=#fefefe
| 454964 ||  || — || October 29, 2005 || Catalina || CSS || — || align=right data-sort-value="0.67" | 670 m || 
|-id=965 bgcolor=#fefefe
| 454965 ||  || — || October 11, 1997 || Kitt Peak || Spacewatch || NYS || align=right data-sort-value="0.52" | 520 m || 
|-id=966 bgcolor=#d6d6d6
| 454966 ||  || — || September 29, 2000 || Anderson Mesa || LONEOS || — || align=right | 3.0 km || 
|-id=967 bgcolor=#d6d6d6
| 454967 ||  || — || October 9, 2004 || Socorro || LINEAR || — || align=right | 3.7 km || 
|-id=968 bgcolor=#fefefe
| 454968 ||  || — || November 3, 2004 || Kitt Peak || Spacewatch || — || align=right data-sort-value="0.90" | 900 m || 
|-id=969 bgcolor=#d6d6d6
| 454969 ||  || — || June 1, 1997 || Kitt Peak || Spacewatch || — || align=right | 3.6 km || 
|-id=970 bgcolor=#d6d6d6
| 454970 ||  || — || March 16, 2007 || Mount Lemmon || Mount Lemmon Survey || — || align=right | 5.9 km || 
|-id=971 bgcolor=#d6d6d6
| 454971 ||  || — || October 8, 2004 || Kitt Peak || Spacewatch || — || align=right | 2.4 km || 
|-id=972 bgcolor=#fefefe
| 454972 ||  || — || September 3, 2008 || Kitt Peak || Spacewatch || — || align=right data-sort-value="0.65" | 650 m || 
|-id=973 bgcolor=#d6d6d6
| 454973 ||  || — || September 14, 2009 || Catalina || CSS || — || align=right | 3.2 km || 
|-id=974 bgcolor=#E9E9E9
| 454974 ||  || — || July 3, 2005 || Kitt Peak || Spacewatch || GEF || align=right | 1.1 km || 
|-id=975 bgcolor=#fefefe
| 454975 ||  || — || December 30, 2005 || Mount Lemmon || Mount Lemmon Survey || — || align=right data-sort-value="0.90" | 900 m || 
|-id=976 bgcolor=#fefefe
| 454976 ||  || — || September 15, 2004 || Kitt Peak || Spacewatch || — || align=right data-sort-value="0.75" | 750 m || 
|-id=977 bgcolor=#fefefe
| 454977 ||  || — || December 30, 2008 || Mount Lemmon || Mount Lemmon Survey || V || align=right data-sort-value="0.65" | 650 m || 
|-id=978 bgcolor=#E9E9E9
| 454978 ||  || — || September 18, 2003 || Kitt Peak || Spacewatch || — || align=right data-sort-value="0.82" | 820 m || 
|-id=979 bgcolor=#d6d6d6
| 454979 ||  || — || March 16, 2007 || Kitt Peak || Spacewatch || — || align=right | 2.8 km || 
|-id=980 bgcolor=#E9E9E9
| 454980 ||  || — || September 26, 2006 || Kitt Peak || Spacewatch || NEM || align=right | 2.6 km || 
|-id=981 bgcolor=#d6d6d6
| 454981 ||  || — || March 7, 2008 || Kitt Peak || Spacewatch || — || align=right | 2.4 km || 
|-id=982 bgcolor=#fefefe
| 454982 ||  || — || December 22, 2008 || Mount Lemmon || Mount Lemmon Survey || — || align=right data-sort-value="0.86" | 860 m || 
|-id=983 bgcolor=#d6d6d6
| 454983 ||  || — || November 4, 1999 || Kitt Peak || Spacewatch || — || align=right | 2.2 km || 
|-id=984 bgcolor=#E9E9E9
| 454984 ||  || — || October 11, 1977 || Palomar || PLS || — || align=right | 1.9 km || 
|-id=985 bgcolor=#fefefe
| 454985 ||  || — || December 20, 2004 || Mount Lemmon || Mount Lemmon Survey || MAS || align=right data-sort-value="0.84" | 840 m || 
|-id=986 bgcolor=#d6d6d6
| 454986 ||  || — || September 16, 2003 || Kitt Peak || Spacewatch || — || align=right | 4.5 km || 
|-id=987 bgcolor=#fefefe
| 454987 ||  || — || December 5, 2002 || Socorro || LINEAR || H || align=right data-sort-value="0.76" | 760 m || 
|-id=988 bgcolor=#E9E9E9
| 454988 ||  || — || October 29, 2006 || Catalina || CSS || — || align=right | 2.4 km || 
|-id=989 bgcolor=#d6d6d6
| 454989 ||  || — || September 21, 2004 || Anderson Mesa || LONEOS || — || align=right | 3.2 km || 
|-id=990 bgcolor=#fefefe
| 454990 ||  || — || March 19, 2009 || Kitt Peak || Spacewatch || H || align=right data-sort-value="0.59" | 590 m || 
|-id=991 bgcolor=#d6d6d6
| 454991 ||  || — || March 2, 2006 || Kitt Peak || Spacewatch || — || align=right | 2.3 km || 
|-id=992 bgcolor=#fefefe
| 454992 ||  || — || October 10, 2005 || Catalina || CSS || — || align=right data-sort-value="0.79" | 790 m || 
|-id=993 bgcolor=#fefefe
| 454993 ||  || — || November 21, 2009 || Mount Lemmon || Mount Lemmon Survey || — || align=right data-sort-value="0.81" | 810 m || 
|-id=994 bgcolor=#fefefe
| 454994 ||  || — || August 11, 2007 || Anderson Mesa || LONEOS || — || align=right data-sort-value="0.98" | 980 m || 
|-id=995 bgcolor=#fefefe
| 454995 ||  || — || December 15, 2004 || Kitt Peak || Spacewatch || — || align=right data-sort-value="0.65" | 650 m || 
|-id=996 bgcolor=#fefefe
| 454996 ||  || — || October 20, 1998 || Caussols || ODAS || — || align=right data-sort-value="0.51" | 510 m || 
|-id=997 bgcolor=#d6d6d6
| 454997 ||  || — || October 5, 2004 || Kitt Peak || Spacewatch || — || align=right | 3.1 km || 
|-id=998 bgcolor=#d6d6d6
| 454998 ||  || — || March 14, 2007 || Kitt Peak || Spacewatch || EOS || align=right | 2.0 km || 
|-id=999 bgcolor=#E9E9E9
| 454999 ||  || — || August 25, 2001 || Kitt Peak || Spacewatch || — || align=right | 1.9 km || 
|-id=000 bgcolor=#d6d6d6
| 455000 ||  || — || March 30, 2008 || Kitt Peak || Spacewatch || EOS || align=right | 1.8 km || 
|}

References

External links 
 Discovery Circumstances: Numbered Minor Planets (450001)–(455000) (IAU Minor Planet Center)

0454